= List of mammals of Massachusetts =

This is a list of mammals of Massachusetts. It includes all mammals currently living in Massachusetts, whether resident or as migrants, as well as extirpated species. For the most part, it does not include each mammal's specific habitat, but instead shows the mammal's range in the state and its abundance.

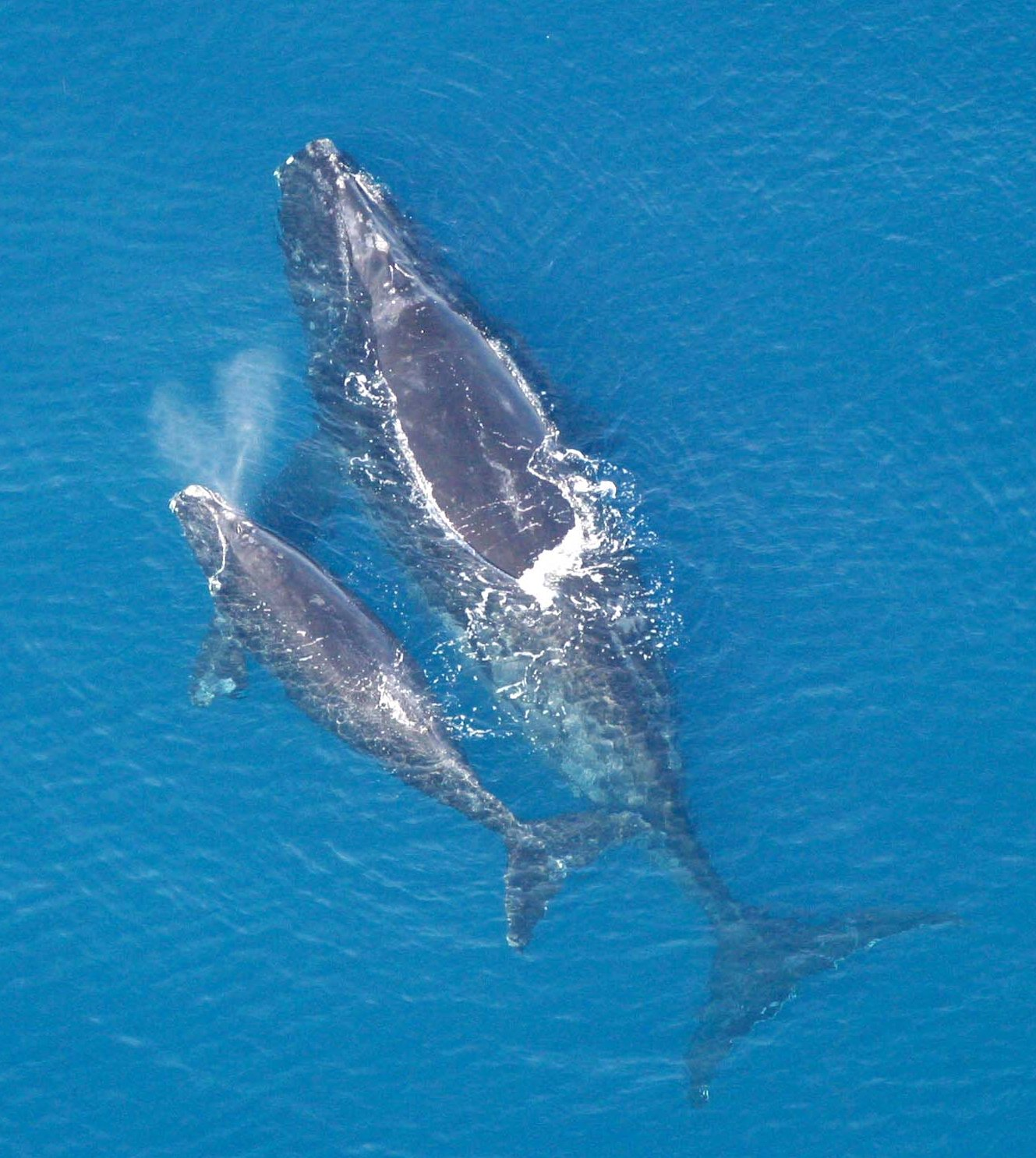
The Atlantic right whale is the state marine mammal of Massachusetts

== Chiroptera (bats) ==
In 2008, white-nose syndrome was recorded in Massachusetts. Afterwards, the bat population declined by 98%, and thus, in 2012, the little brown myotis, northern long-eared myotis, and tricolored bats were listed as endangered in the state.

Name	Species/authority	Family	Range and status	IUCN Red List
Big brown bat	Eptesicus fuscus Beauvois, 1796	Vespertilionidae	Common, live statewide	
Silver-haired bat	Lasionycteris noctivagans Le Conte, 1831	Vespertilionidae	Migratory, uncommon, statewide	
Eastern red bat	Lasiurus borealis Müller, 1776	Vespertilionidae	Migratory, common, statewide	
Hoary bat	Lasiurus cinereus Beauvois, 1796	Vespertilionidae	Migratory, rarely seen, statewide	
Eastern small-footed myotis	Myotis leibii Audubon & Bachman, 1842	Vespertilionidae	Berkshire and Hampden counties, extremely rare, listed as special concern	
Little brown bat	Myotis lucifugus Le Conte, 1831	Vespertilionidae	Endangered, distribution spotty	
Northern long-eared myotis	Myotis septentrionalis Trouessart, 1897	Vespertilionidae	Endangered, distribution spotty, reportedly breeding in Martha's Vineyard	
Indiana bat	Myotis sodalis Miller & Allen, 1928	Vespertilionidae	Very rare, Western Massachusetts only, listed as endangered in the state and federally	
Tricolored bat	Perimyotis subflavus Cuvier, 1832	Vespertilionidae	Threatened, distribution spotty	

== Carnivora (carnivorans) ==
Name	Species/authority	Family	Range and status	IUCN Red List
Eastern coyote	Canis latrans	Canidae	Common; statewide, except Nantucket	
Eastern wolf	Canis lycaon	Canidae	Extirpated; last reported in 1840, although there were two sightings in 1918 and 2007 in Franklin County	
Gray fox	Urocyon cinereoargenteus	Canidae	Common; statewide except Dukes, Nantucket, and Suffolk counties	
Red fox	Vulpes vulpes	Canidae	Common; statewide except Martha's Vineyard and Nantucket	
Raccoon	Procyon lotor	Procyonidae	Common, statewide except Nantucket	
American black bear	Ursus americanus	Ursidae	Rarity varies locally; found in most of the state, but not common in southeast Massachusetts.	
Canada lynx	Lynx canadensis	Felidae	Extirpated; formerly central and western Massachusetts; reported in Hampshire (1866) and Worcester (1884–1885) counties, questionable reports in the 1930s were probably bobcats; two records in 1991	
Bobcat	Lynx rufus	Felidae	Common in northeastern, central and western Massachusetts, but rare in southeastern Massachusetts and Cape Cod; absent in the islands	
Eastern cougar	Puma concolor couguar	Felidae	Extirpated; last known record was in 1858. However, in 1997, a DNA testing of feces found in the Quabbin Reservoir in Franklin County was that of a cougar, although it could have been an escaped captive	
Wolverine	Gulo gulo	Mustelidae	Extirpated; lasted reported in 1835, formerly western Massachusetts	
North American river otter	Lontra canadensis	Mustelidae	Common; statewide except Suffolk County; records in Nantucket in 1984 and 2007	
American marten	Martes americana	Mustelidae	Extirpated; formerly central, western, and possibly northeastern Massachusetts; last reported in Worcester County (1880) although two records in 1992 and 1993 may have come from Vermont	
American ermine	Mustela richardsonii	Mustelidae	Common; statewide except Dukes and Nantucket counties; rare in Cape Cod	
Long-tailed weasel	Neogale frenata	Mustelidae	Common; statewide except Dukes and Nantucket counties	
Sea mink	Neogale macrodon	Mustelidae	Formerly coastal Massachusetts; became extinct from overtrapping	
American mink	Neogale vison	Mustelidae	Common; statewide except Nantucket, possibly extirpated from Martha's Vineyard	
Fisher	Pekania pennanti	Mustelidae	Common; statewide except Dukes and Nantucket counties	
Striped skunk	Mephitis mephitis	Mephitidae	Common, statewide except the Elizabeth Islands and Nantucket	
Bearded seal	Erignathus barbatus	Phocidae	One record; Essex County (2002)	
Grey seal	Halichoerus grypus	Phocidae	Found in Barnstable, Dukes, and Nantucket counties; Population has increased after seal hunting became illegal in 1962, known pupping sights are in Monomoy and Muskeget islands	
Harp seal	Pagophilus groenlandicus	Phocidae	Common winter visitor; reported from Plymouth, Suffolk, Essex, and Barnstable counties. Sightings are increasing, especially in winter	
Harbor seal	Phoca vitulina	Phocidae	A common seal in Massachusetts. Found in coastal areas, including Barnstable, Suffolk, Essex, and Plymouth counties. Regular winter visitor in Cape Cod and the islands. Originally bred in the state but no known breeding areas. However, pups have been reported in Plymouth	
Ringed seal	Pusa hispida	Phocidae	Uncommon in Massachusetts; most seen in winter	
Walrus	Odobenus rosmarus	Odobenidae	Rare vagrant. Reported from Essex (1937) and Plymouth (1734) counties	

== Cetacea (cetaceans) ==
Name	Species/authority	Family	Range and status	IUCN Red List
Bowhead whale	Balaena mysticetus	Balaenidae	Occasionally seen in winter; probably uncommon	
North Atlantic right whale	Eubalaena glacialis	Balaenidae	Uncommon, winter and spring visitor in Cape Cod Bay	
Northern bottlenose whale	Hyperoodon ampullatus	Ziphiidae	Rare, pelagic, stranded in Barnstable and Essex counties	
Sowerby's beaked whale	Mesoplodon bidens	Ziphiidae	Only two records in Nantucket	
Blainville's beaked whale	Mesoplodon densirostris	Ziphiidae	One record in Essex County	
Gervais' beaked whale	Mesoplodon europaeus	Ziphiidae	One record in Cape Cod	
True's beaked whale	Mesoplodon mirus	Ziphiidae	One record in Nantucket	
Cuvier's beaked whale	Ziphius cavirostris	Ziphiidae	Pelagic, stranded in Barnstable, Norfolk, and Dukes counties	
Beluga whale	Delphinapterus leucas	Monodontidae	Vagrant, observed in the waters of Essex, Barnstable, Dukes, and Bristol counties	
Short-beaked common dolphin	Delphinus delphis	Delphinidae	Uncommon, found in Barnstable, Bristol, Dukes, and Nantucket counties	
Short-finned pilot whale	Globicephala macrorhynchus	Delphinidae	Uncommon, occurs in schools, primarily found in warmer waters offshore	
Long-finned pilot whale	Globicephala melas	Delphinidae	Uncommon, occurs in schools and is frequently stranded	
Risso's dolphin	Grampus griseus	Delphinidae	Uncommon, offshore waters, stranded in Barnstable, Dukes, and Norfolk counties	
White-beaked dolphin	Lagenorhynchus albirostris	Delphinidae	Rare, found in coastal waters, reported from Barnstable and Essex counties	
Atlantic white-sided dolphin	Leucopleurus acutus	Delphinidae	Common, found in coastal waters, stranded in Norfolk, Essex, Barnstable, Dukes, and Nantucket	
Killer whale	Orcinus orca	Delphinidae	Rare, offshore waters, stranded in Barnstable and Dukes counties, observed in Plymouth and Suffolk counties	
Pantropical spotted dolphin	Stenella attenuata	Delphinidae	Uncommon, found in offshore waters	
Striped dolphin	Stenella coeruleoalba	Delphinidae	Rare, pelagic, reported from Dukes, Nantucket, Plymouth, Barnstable, and Essex counties	
Atlantic spotted dolphin	Stenella frontalis	Delphinidae	Rare, reported from Nantucket and Dukes counties	
Common bottlenose dolphin	Tursiops truncatus	Delphinidae	Rare, found in inshore waters, stranded in Barnstable and Plymouth counties	
Pygmy sperm whale	Kogia breviceps	Physeteroidea	Rare, found in offshore waters, stranded in Barnstable, Plymouth, Essex, Norfolk, and Dukes counties, recorded in Bristol County waters	
Dwarf sperm whale	Kogia sima	Physeteroidea	Rarely seen, stranded in Nantucket and Plymouth counties, distinguished from the pygmy sperm whale by being smaller and having a larger dorsal fin	
Sperm whale	Physeter macrocephalus	Physeteroidea	Rare, formerly abundant offshore, stranded in Barnstable, Dukes, Essex, Nantucket, and Plymouth counties. The largest toothed whale. Dives deep to hunt for food	
Harbour porpoise	Phocoena phocoena	Phocoenidae	Common, found entirely in coastal waters	
Common minke whale	Balaenoptera acutorostrata	Rorqual	Common, found in the inshore waters, stranded in Norfolk, Essex, Barnstable, Dukes, and Nantucket counties	
Sei whale	Balaenoptera borealis	Rorqual	Found in Cape Cod Bay and Massachusetts Bay, stranded in Cape Cod (1910 and 1974), Essex (2007), and Plymouth (1948) counties, endangered and rare in Massachusetts	
Blue whale	Balaenoptera musculus	Rorqual	One questionable stranding in Essex County reported in 1755, Recent near-shore records, endangered and rare in Massachusetts	
Fin whale	Balaenoptera physalus	Rorqual	Common but endangered, stranded in Barnstable, Essex, Dukes, and Plymouth counties	
Humpback whale	Megaptera novaeangliae	Rorqual	Common but endangered, stranded in Barnstable, Dukes, Essex, Nantucket, Norfolk, Plymouth, and Suffolk counties	

== Artiodactyla (even-toed ungulates) ==
Name	Species/authority	Family	Range and status	IUCN Red List
American bison	Bison bison	Bovidae	Extirpated	
Moose	Alces alces	Cervidae	Common; found in north, western, and eastern Massachusetts. Total population is over 1000 individuals	
Eastern elk	Cervus canadensis canadensis	Cervidae	Extirpated, formerly western Massachusetts; last record in Worcester County in 1732	
Fallow deer	Dama dama	Cervidae	Introduced in Dukes County; last reported in 1980	
White-tailed deer	Odocoileus virginianus	Cervidae	Common; statewide	
Boreal woodland caribou	Rangifer tarandus caribou	Cervidae	Extirpated	

== Lagomorpha (rabbits and hares) ==
Name	Species/authority	Family	Range and status	IUCN Red List
Snowshoe hare	Lepus americanus	Leporidae	Common; statewide except Dukes County; introduced to Nantucket	
Black-tailed jackrabbit	Lepus californicus	Leporidae	Introduced, uncommon; found only in Nantucket	
European hare	Lepus europaeus	Leporidae	Introduced; found only in Berkshire County	
European rabbit	Oryctolagus cuniculus	Leporidae	Introduced to Lovells Island and Gallops Island	
Eastern cottontail	Sylvilagus floridanus	Leporidae	Introduced, common, statewide	
New England cottontail	Sylvilagus transitionalis	Leporidae	Rare; formerly common and found statewide, now found only in Cape Cod, Nantucket, and southwestern Massachusetts	

== Didelphimorphia (New World opossums) ==
Name	Species/authority	Family	Range and status	IUCN Red List
Virginia opossum	Didelphis virginiana	Didelphinae	Common; statewide except Dukes and Nantucket counties	

== Rodentia (rodents) ==
Name	Species/authority	Family	Range and status	IUCN Red List
North American beaver	Castor canadensis	Castoridae	Common; northeastern, Central, and Western Massachusetts	
Meadow vole	Microtus pennsylvanicus	Cricetidae	Common; statewide	
Beach vole	Microtus pennsylvanicus breweri	Cricetidae	endemic to Muskeget Island	
Woodland vole	Microtus pinetorum	Cricetidae	Locally common; statewide except Dukes and Nantucket counties	
Southern red-backed vole	Myodes gapperi	Cricetidae	Common; statewide except Martha's Vineyard and Nantucket	
Allegheny woodrat	Neotoma magister	Cricetidae	Extirpated; may have occurred in southwestern Berkshire County	
Muskrat	Ondantra zibethicus	Cricetidae	Common; statewide except Nantucket	
White-footed mouse	Peromyscus leucopus	Cricetidae	Common; statewide	
Eastern deer mouse	Peromyscus maniculatus	Cricetidae	Common; central and western Massachusetts	
Southern bog lemming	Synaptomys cooperi	Cricetidae	Very rare; listed as special concern. Known from the towns of Plymouth, Wareham, New Salem, Ware, and Belchertown	
Woodland jumping mouse	Napaeozapus insignis	Dipodidae	Common; Central and western Massachusetts	
Meadow jumping mouse	Zapus hudsonius	Dipodidae	Common; statewide	
House mouse	Mus musculus	Muridae	Introduced; statewide except Martha's Vineyard	
Brown rat	Rattus norvegicus	Muridae	Introduced; statewide	
Black rat	Rattus rattus	Muridae	Introduced; statewide	
North American porcupine	Erethizon dorsatum	Erethizonidae	Common; northeastern, central, and western Massachusetts	
Northern flying squirrel	Glaucomys sabrinus	Sciuridae	Uncommon; northeastern, central, and western Massachusetts	
Southern flying squirrel	Glaucomys volans	Sciuridae	Common; statewide except Dukes and Nantucket counties	
Groundhog	Marmota monax	Sciuridae	Common; statewide except Dukes and Nantucket counties	
Eastern gray squirrel	Sciurus carolinensis	Sciuridae	Common; statewide, introduced in Nantucket in 1989	
Eastern chipmunk	Tamias striatus	Sciuridae	Common; statewide except Nantucket	
American red squirrel	Tamiasciurus hudsonicus	Sciuridae	Common; statewide except Dukes and Nantucket counties	

== Eulipotyphla (shrews and moles) ==
Name	Species/authority	Family	Range and status	IUCN Red List
Northern short-tailed shrew	Blarina brevicauda	Soricidae	Common; statewide	
Cinereus shrew	Sorex cinereus	Soricidae	Common; statewide	
Long-tailed shrew	Sorex dispar	Soricidae	Rare; special concern; found only in Berkshire County	
Smoky shrew	Sorex fumeus	Soricidae	Uncommon; Central and Western Massachusetts	
American pygmy shrew	Sorex hoyi	Soricidae	One record; Berkshire County (1991)	
American water shrew	Sorex palustris	Soricidae	Uncommon; special concern, found in Central and Western Massachusetts	
Star-nosed mole	Condylura cristata	Talpidae	Common; statewide except Dukes and Nantucket counties	
Hairy-tailed mole	Parascalops breweri	Talpidae	Uncommon; northeastern, Central, and Western Massachusetts	
Eastern mole	Scalopus aquaticus	Talpidae	Common; found in southern Plymouth county, southern Connecticut River Valley, Cape Cod, and Dukes and Nantucket counties	

== See also ==
- Mammals of New England
- List of Massachusetts birds
- List of reptiles of Massachusetts
- List of mammal genera
- Lists of mammals by region
- List of mammals in Connecticut
- List of mammals in North America
