= List of mammals of Connecticut =

This list of mammals of Connecticut includes both native and nonnative species (introduced or invasive) found in the U.S. state of Connecticut now or in the past, but not domesticated or farm animals.

Many mammals formerly extirpated in the state have returned, sometimes with active human projects and sometimes through a natural expansion from neighboring states as Connecticut's natural environment has become more welcoming to them.

Many mammal species were removed from Connecticut or almost became extinct within the state through hunting and clearing forests to create farmland, starting in the 17th century with European colonization and continuing until the 19th century, when most of the state's forest covering had been replaced with farmland. Populations of moose, turkeys, black bears and mountain lions lost their habitats and were greatly reduced or eliminated in Connecticut. Pollution in the 19th and 20th centuries also played a role in either greatly reducing or extirpating some species, such as the bald eagle.

With the collapse of farming in the 19th century and its continued decline in the state in the 20th century, forests spread back over much of the land. They are not the same forests, however: Chestnut trees, for instance, wiped out by a disease, are not nearly as prevalent as they once were, and the lack of their nuts affects the populations of various mammals. Stone walls, built largely in the 19th century, provide more welcoming homes to certain species; and mammals from Europe, including the house mouse and Norway rat, and from elsewhere (such as the coyote) can create a different competitive environment for some species and a different food source for some (the American barn owl, for instance, can now feed on Norway rats).

To some extent, deforestation and fragmentation of forests has occurred in recent decades with expanded residential development. Some improvements have come with the removal of certain industries from Connecticut since the mid-20th century and the installation of more sewage treatment plants and improvements in their functioning. Residual industrial pollution remains, however, and prevailing winds keep Connecticut on the receiving end of pollution from the New York City metropolitan area and other areas south and west of the state, Connecticut also continues to produce some of its own pollution.

Dead animals killed by cars on the state's roads are one of the primary ways state residents see diverse varieties of local mammals. The more common roadkill in Connecticut consists of striped skunks, opossums, raccoons, and gray squirrels.

== Species ==
(This list of species concentrates on the habitats in the state in which they can be found, how prevalent they are or have been in the state, history of their prevalence in Connecticut and any other information directly related to the mammals' existence in the state — including laws and regulations, state-sponsored re-introductions, and notable sitings. Descriptions of the species or other, more general information not related to Connecticut can be found by following the links to Wikipedia articles on the individual species.)

Opossums (Order Didelphimorphia, Family Didelphidae)

- Virginia opossum (Didelphis virginiana) — common in wooded areas, farmland, drier areas of wetlands, rural areas and in some other habitats in the state; came to Connecticut from the south in the early 20th century, a movement likely helped by its attraction to human-created food sources such as crops and trash, although it eats just about anything, including carrion. Many are run over on Connecticut roads.

=== Shrews and moles ===
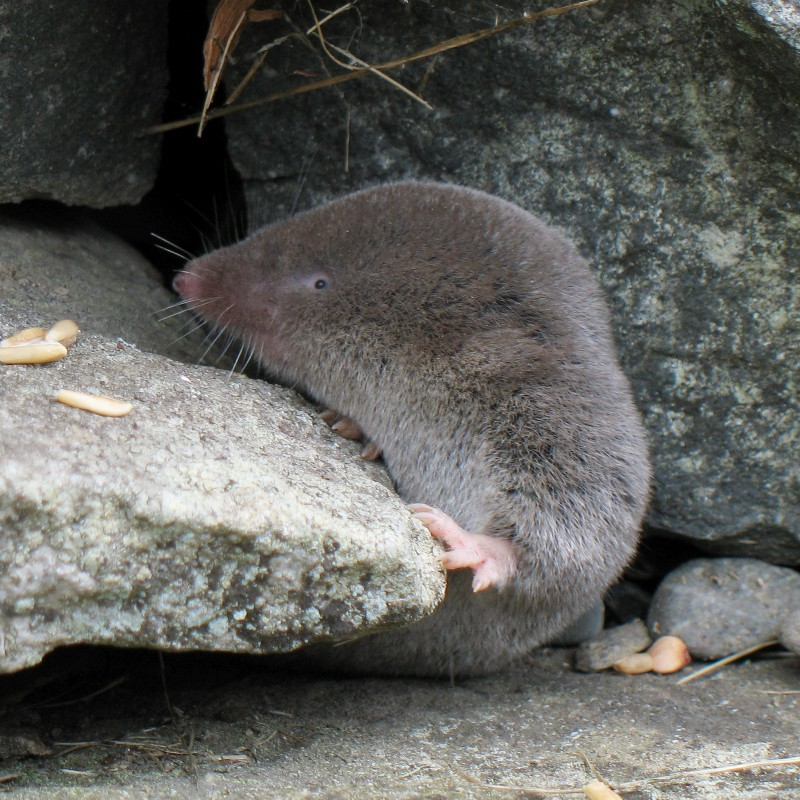
Northern short-tailed shrew

Shrews (Order Eulipotyphla, Family Soricidae)

- Northern short-tailed shrew (Blarina brevicauda) — very common in leafy or grassy ground (usually in wooded areas)
- Smoky shrew (Sorex fumeus) — common, especially in moist, shady spots
- Masked shrew (Sorex cinereus) — plentiful in the state, especially in moist, shady spots.
- Water shrew (Sorex palustris) — uncommon; found near water
- Least shrew (Cryptotis parva) — rare in Connecticut, where the species reaches its eastern limit and close to its northern limit (it is also in central New York state); in this state, only found in coastal areas with high beach dunes and neighboring brackish marshes; all other shrews in the state have much longer tails (at least as long as the rest of their bodies). As of late 2007, the species was the only mammal listed on the Connecticut endangered species list, and it was the first mammal ever put on the list. The greatest threat facing least shrews in the state is land development along the coast, which limits the land available for the species and isolates breeding populations. Other threats are pesticides and pollutants contaminating food and habitat. The animal was first identified in Darien, Connecticut, in 1840 by Reverend James H. Linsley, but not seen again for 100 years. In 1941, George Goodwin, assistant curator of mammals at the American Museum of Natural History, in New York City, found one in Westbrook at the edge of a saltgrass meadow. The animal again went without documented sightings until it was found in 1989 in coastal Middlesex County in 1989. As of 2007, this is the only documented Connecticut location of the species.

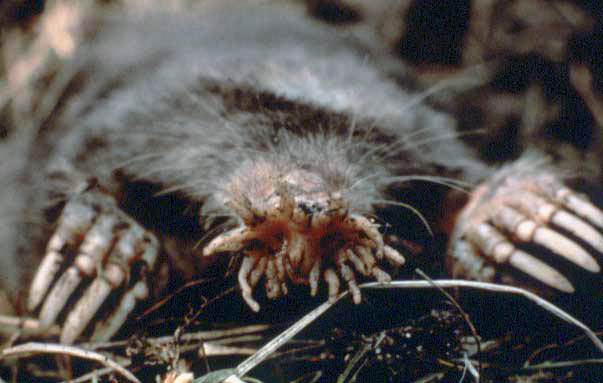
Star-nosed mole

Moles (Order Eulipotyphla, Family Talpidae)

- Eastern mole (Scalopus aquaticus) — common in the state; usually found in fields, lawns and wooded areas that aren't too wet; much less prevalent in higher elevations in the northern parts of the state
- Star-nosed mole (Condylura cristata) — common in wet or moist soils near water, less common in upland areas that are moist; apparently active at ground level during the night (when wildlife expert Geoffrey A. Hammerson found 583 samples of food items in a sample of barn owl pellets in central Connecticut, 24 of them were star-nosed moles; none were eastern moles)
- Hairy-tailed mole (Parascalops breweri) — somewhat common in well-drained areas in northwestern part of the state

=== Bats ===
Bats (Order Chiroptera, Family Vespertilionidae)

The state has eight extant species of bats, plus at least one which may now be extirpated from the state.

Because some bats have rabies, the state Department of Environmental Protection (now DEEP) advises on its Web site:

"If a bat has bitten or scratched a person or a pet, or is found in a situation where exposure cannot be ruled out, contact the DEP Wildlife Division at (860) 424-3011 or DEP Emergency Dispatch at (860) 424-3333 for advice. An example of a situation where exposure cannot be ruled out is when a bat is found in the same room as a sleeping individual or a very young child."

Bats that occupy buildings:

- Little brown bat (Myotis lucifugus) — common and widespread in the state; this and the big brown bat are the two most common bat species in the state
- Big brown bat (Eptesicus fuscus) — winters in the state, often hibernating in buildings, occasionally caves; a bat seen in winter is probably this species; in summer it often roosts in attics; it breeds in the state.

Bats that roost in trees in summer:

- Silver-haired bat (Lasionycteris noctivagans) — uncommon; usually seen near water; listed as a Connecticut species of special concern
- Red bat (Lasiurus borealis) — usually found at lower elevations; seldom seen and listed as a Connecticut species of special concern
- Hoary bat (Lasiurus cinereus) — seldom seen and listed as a Connecticut species of special concern
- Northern long-eared myotis or long-eared bat (Myotis septentrionalis)

Bats that hibernate in caves and tunnels:

- Northern long-eared myotis (see above)
- Little brown bat (see above)
- Eastern small-footed bat (Myotis leibii) — believed to have been extirpated in the state, and it was probably always scarce; no confirmed sightings have been recorded in the state for several decades; listed by the state as a "species of special concern"
- Indiana bat (Myotis sodalis) — in the several decades up to 2004, only one was ever found in the state; the bat is on both state and federal lists of endangered species
- Tricolored bat (Perimyotis subflavus or Pipistrellus subflavus)

=== Rabbits and hares ===
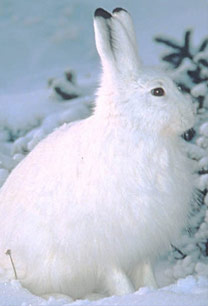
Snowshoe hare

Rabbits and hares (Order Lagomorpha, Family Leporidae)

- Eastern cottontail (Sylvilagus floridanus) — introduced to New England in the late 1800s and has expanded its range at the expense of the native New England cottontail. The species originally came from the south. By the 1930s, New England cottontails were still considered more numerous than the eastern cottontail, but both species were declining as farms reverted to forests; found in shrubby and open areas, often in disturbed areas. Hammonasset Beach State Park has many of them; in the early evening, 30 to 40 can be found along the entrance road.
- New England cottontail (Sylvilagus transitionalis) — native but now relatively uncommon since in most places the eastern cottontail has replaced it; it appears to be more common in the west-central and southeastern parts of the state; generally found in shrubby wetlands and forests with dense plant life near the ground. Another possible reason for the decline of this species could be the loss of areas with suitable ground cover, which protects the animals from predators. Loss of farmland to forests is thought to have reduced the population since the 1930s, when New England cottontails were still thought to outnumber eastern cottontails.
- Snowshoe hare (Lepus americanus) — common in the northern part of the state, usually where there are dense thickets; the population in Connecticut doesn't soar cyclically, as the species does farther north

=== Rodents ===
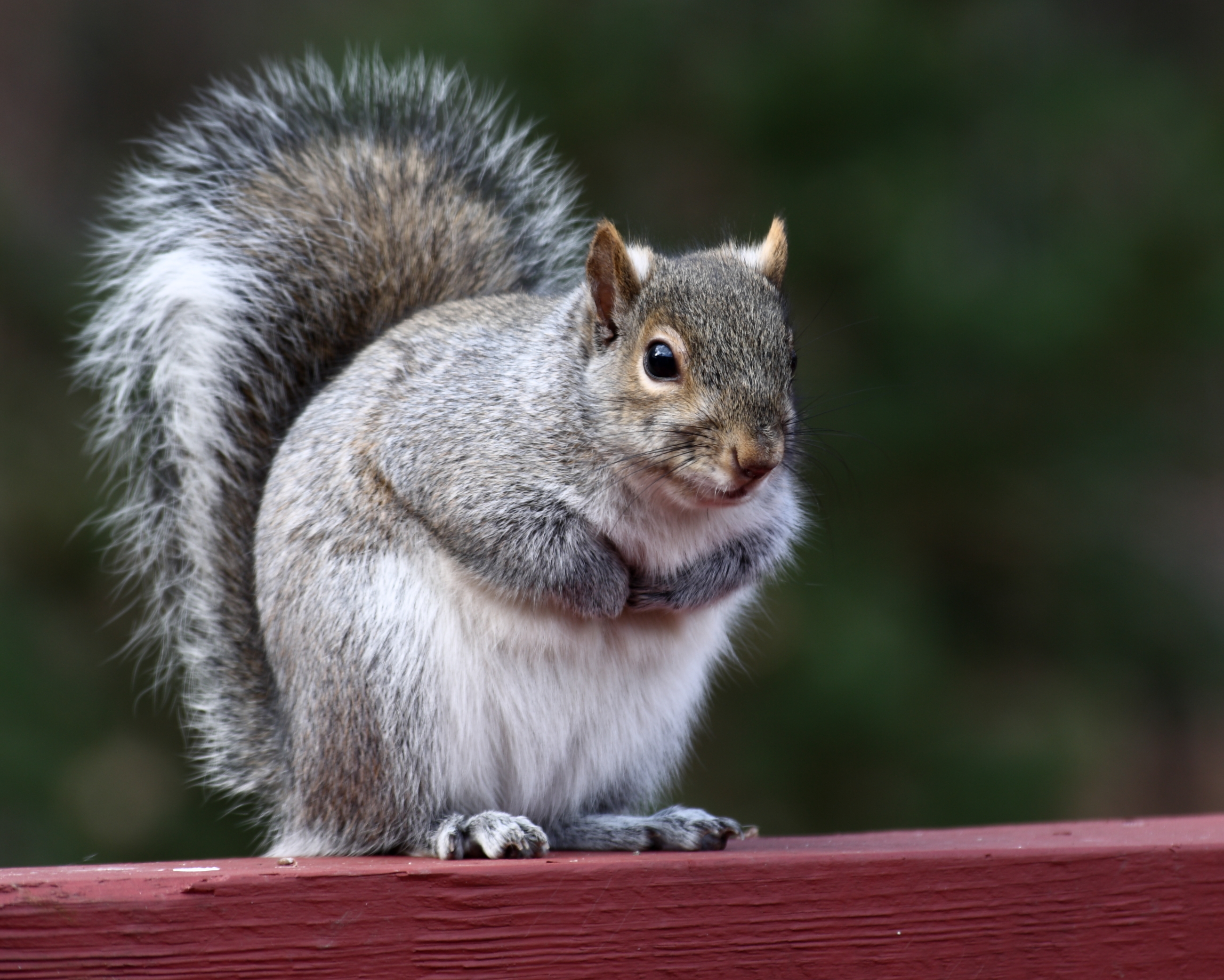
Eastern gray squirrel

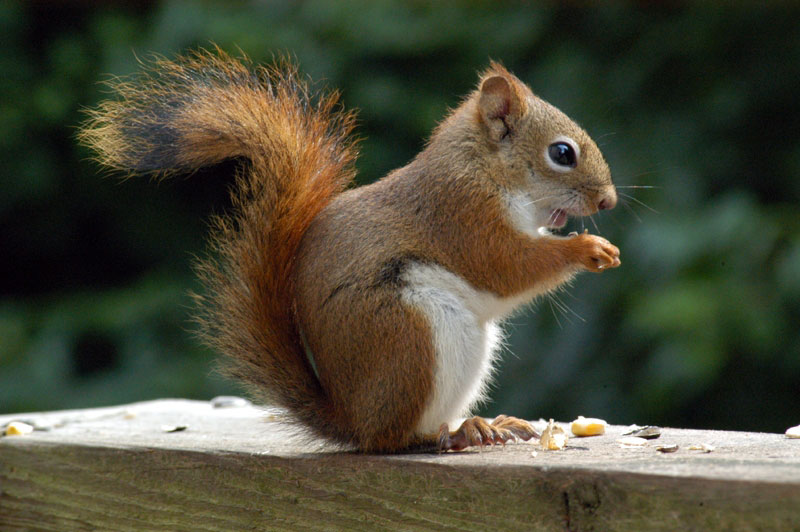
American red squirrel

Squirrel family (Order Rodentia, Family Sciuridae)

- Groundhog, woodchuck or whistle pig (Marmota monax) — scarce when Europeans first came to North America, but they have thrived since then.
- Eastern gray squirrel (Sciurus carolinensis) — the most frequently seen mammal in Connecticut and the largest squirrel found in the state. Acorn production can fluctuate greatly from year to year, affecting the squirrel population. Historically, there have been reports of large migrations of squirrels, including one in 1933 involving at least 1,000 gray squirrels swimming across the Connecticut River between Hartford and Essex. Limited food supply probably causes these migrations, although the exact causes are unknown. In Stratford, white squirrels, a local variant of the species, had been seen for years as of 2010 in different sections of town. Many had some light gray or reddish color and black eyes, indicating they were not albinos.
- Fox squirrel (Sciurus niger) - extirpated
- American red squirrel (Tamiasciurus hudsonicus) — found usually in spots with stands of mature conifers, including white pine or eastern hemlock, but even in those areas there are usually fewer than one individual per acre;
- Northern flying squirrel (Glaucomys sabrinus) — present in just a few areas in northern Connecticut; usually old-growth forests
- Southern flying squirrel (Glaucomys volans) — common where there are nut trees and available nesting cavities, often near streams and wetlands
- Eastern chipmunk (Tamias striatus) — common in woods

Beavers (Order Rodentia, Family Castoridae)

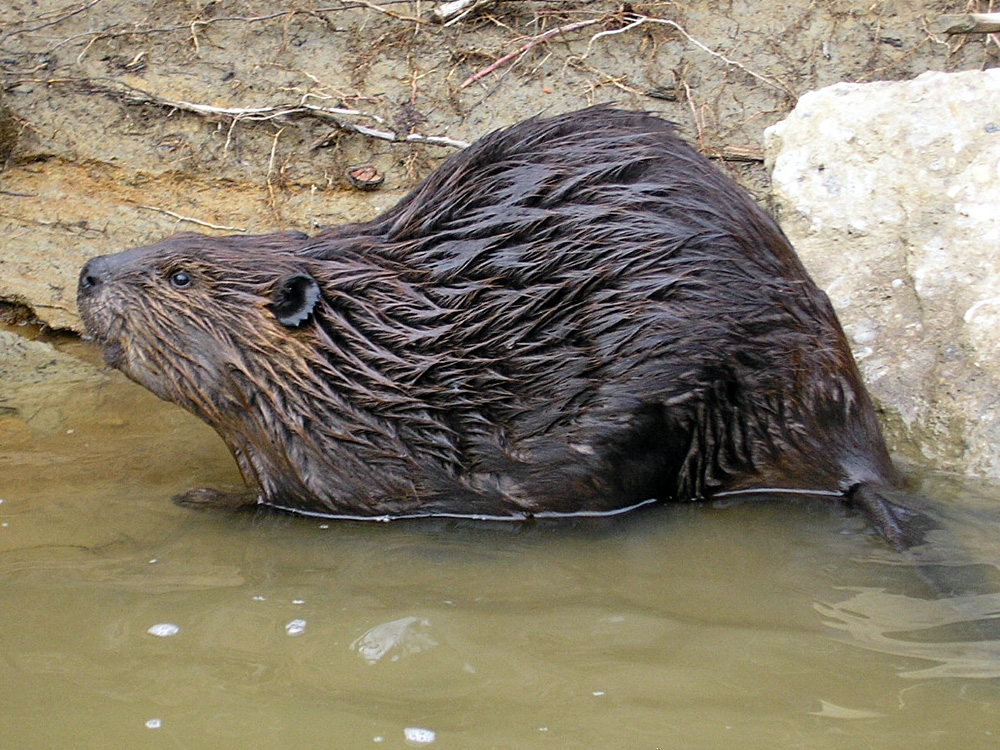
Beaver

- North American beaver (Castor canadensis) — found in small and large low-gradient streams, including tidal parts of the lower Connecticut River, as well as lakes and other water that is both permanently present and deep enough not to freeze all the way to the bottom in winter; most common where its favorite food plants are (such as aspen, birch, willow, cottonwood and soft aquatic plants); they not only dam up smaller streams but can be found in rivers too big to be dammed; common in the state before the arrival of Europeans; trapping led to their extirpation in the state by about 1842, then reintroduced, first in Union in 1914, and at other times up to the 1950s. They thrived so well that in 1961, the first state-regulated trapping season began in order to manage their numbers in light of growing nuisance complaints; the population is large enough now to be trapped, and generally 500 to 1,000 are trapped each year; in the 2001–2002 season a record 1,224 were trapped; in 2000 it was estimated there were between 5,000 and 8,000 beavers in the state; they can annoy homeowners with their tree cutting and flooding from their dams (which help some species but hurt others); in Connecticut, people must get a permit from their town wetlands commission before altering beaver dams to prevent or reduce flooding

Mice, rats, voles, lemmings (Order Rodentia, Family Muridae)

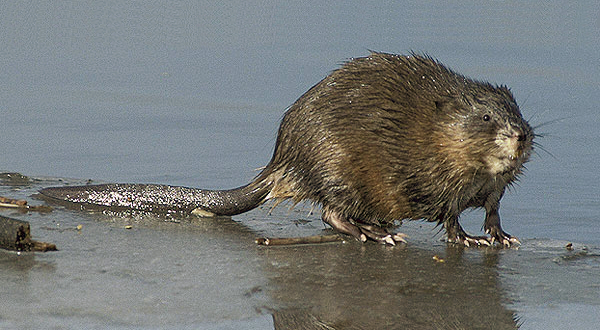
Muskrat

- White-footed mouse (Peromyscus leucopus) — common in woods and especially along forest edges; particularly where there are plenty of nuts or large seeds;
- Eastern deer mouse (Peromyscus maniculatus) — found in the northern part of the state
- Allegheny woodrat (Neotoma magister) — once existed at one site in western part of the state but now extirpated; it has also disappeared from many areas in the Northeastern United States
- Southern red-backed vole (Clethrionomys gapperi) — common in the state, especially in forests with plenty of ground cover such as logs, rocks or old stone walls
- Meadow vole (Microtus pennsylvanicus) — often found in abundance in pastures, meadows, marshes or wherever there is thick, unmowed grasses or sedges
- Woodland vole (Microtus pinetorum) — common in the state; found mostly in partly wooded uplands
- Muskrat (Ondatra zibethicus) — common in ponds, lakes, slow-moving streams, canals, swamps and marshes
- Southern bog lemming (Synaptomys cooperi) — usually lives along the edges of bogs, but also sometimes found in shady uplands with thick humus soil
- House mouse (Mus musculus) — common in cities and farms, associated with people and farmland; comes from Europe
- Norway rat (Rattus norvegicus) — common wherever it can find food, such as at farms, in cities, near garbage dumps or waterfront areas; comes from Europe; barn owls near the New Haven landfill often feed on them

Jumping mice (Order Rodentia, Family Dipodidae, Subfamily Zapodinae)

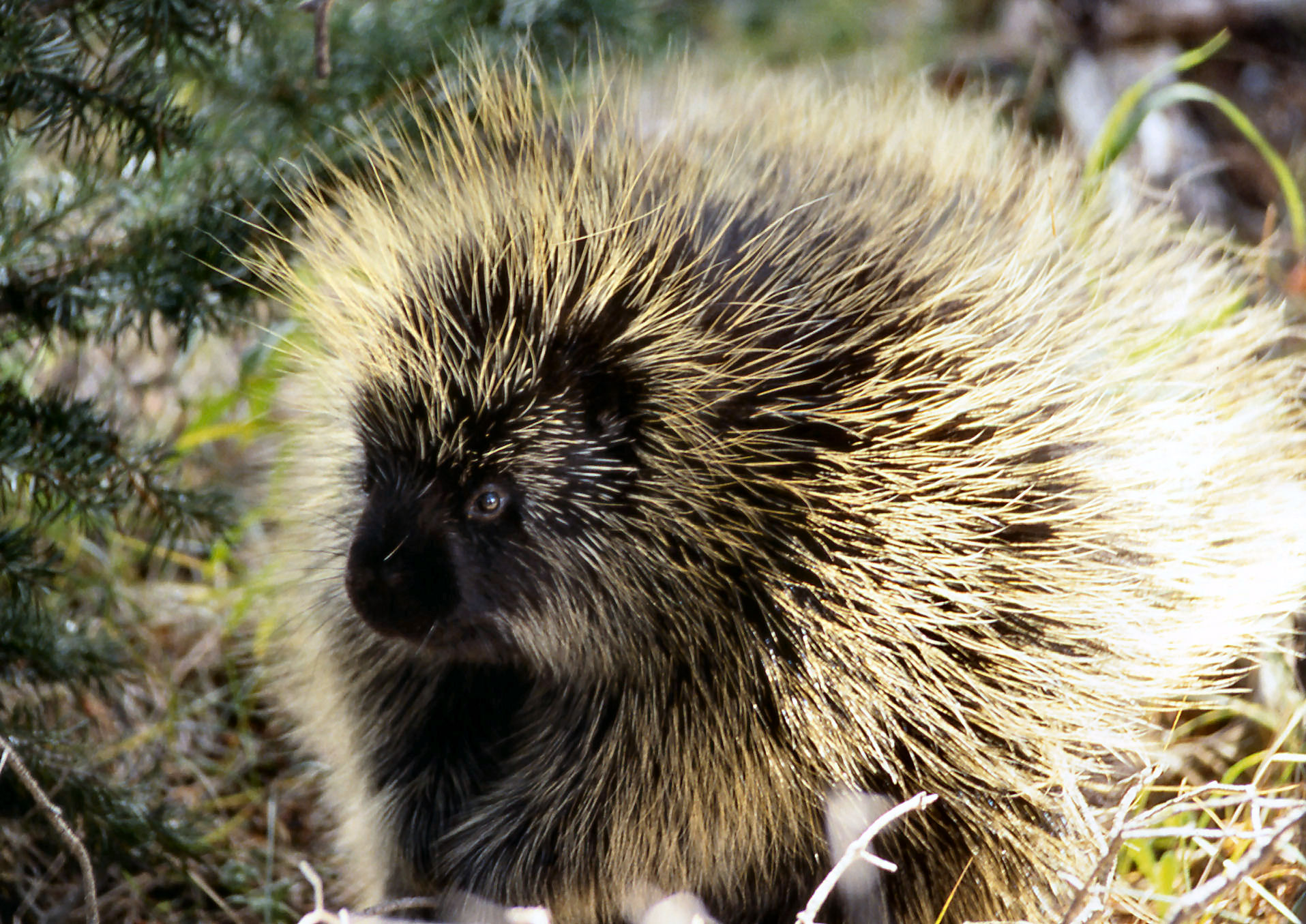
North American porcupine

- Meadow jumping mouse (Zapus hudsonius) — rather common in Connecticut in areas with thick vegetation, including meadows but also old fields, forest edges, often near water
- Woodland jumping mouse (Napaeozapus insignis) — rather common in Connecticut in moist, forested areas or spots with thick shrubs, usually along streams

New World porcupines (Order Rodentia, Family Erethizontidae)

- North American porcupine (Erethizon dorsatum) — uncommon in forested areas in the northern part of the state; usually found in mixed forests including eastern hemlock. Porcupines are most common in northern Litchfield County, especially the towns of Hartland, Colebrook, and Norfolk. It is not uncommon to see them as roadkill along Route 8 through the towns of Winchester and Colebrook.

=== Carnivorans ===
==== Dogs, wolves, coyotes, and foxes (Order Carnivora, Family Canidae) ====
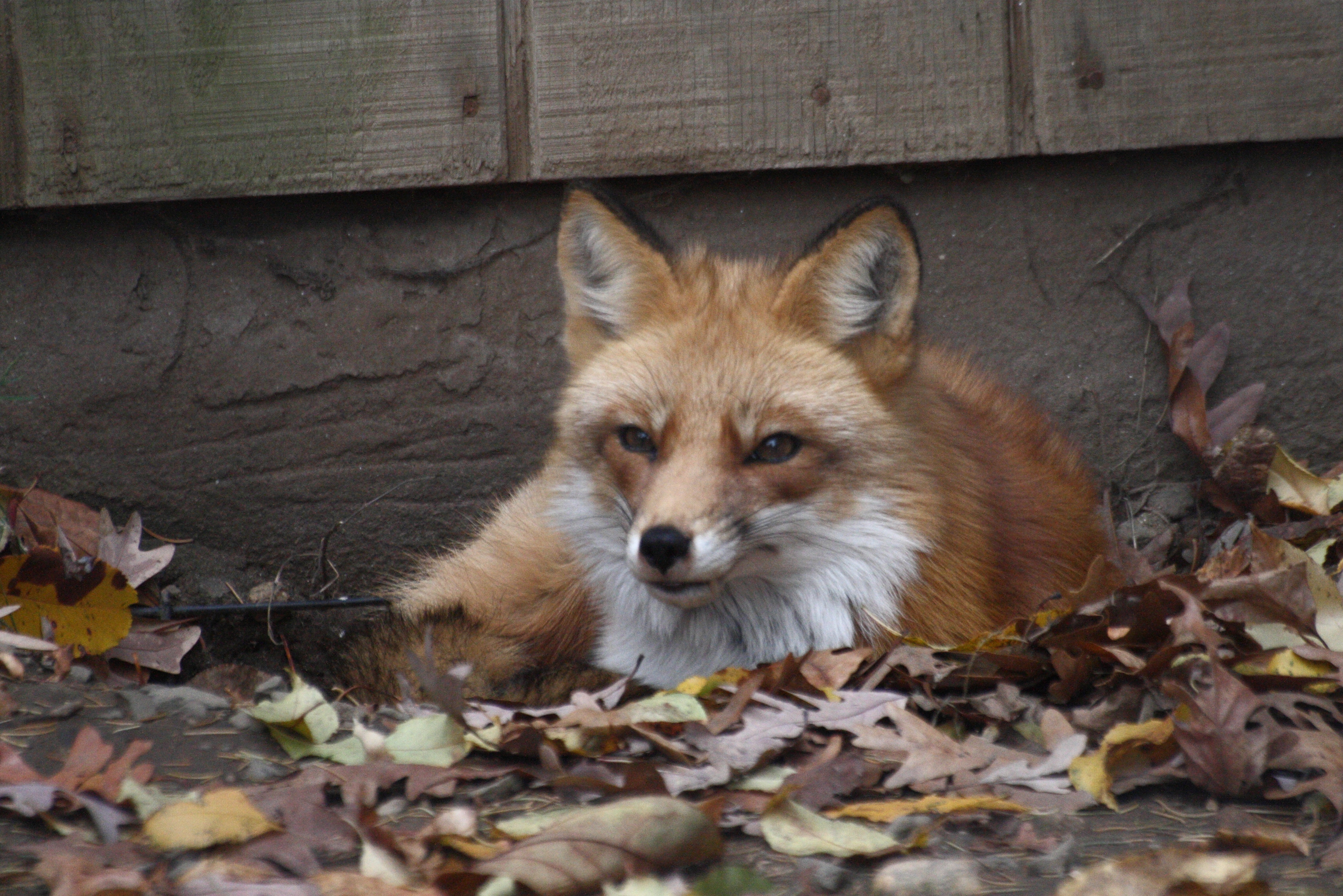
Red fox

- Coyote (Canis latrans) — first spotted in Connecticut in the mid-1950s, with the first 10 years of reports only in the northwestern part of the state, although they have since spread across the entire state. The state Department of Environmental Protection estimates there are 2,000 to 4,000 in the state as of 2007. Anecdotal evidence suggested the population at that time was growing, DEP officials said.
- Gray wolf (Canis lupus) — extirpated in Connecticut in the 19th century; deliberately killed by early settlers, but the population also was hurt by the reduction of its food supply (largely deer); some taxonomists say the wolf that used to inhabit Connecticut was actually the eastern wolf (Canis lycaon)
- Red fox (Vulpes vulpes) — a native species to New England, but it probably interbred with red foxes introduced from Europe; the hybrid is now thought to be the only type in Connecticut; tends to be absent where coyotes are regularly present; prefers habitats with a mixture of fields and forest edges
- Gray fox (Urocyon cinereoargenteus) — fairly common, but less so than the red fox; it tends to inhabit denser forests than the red fox; the population has been growing for the past century with reforestation in the state the main cause; in the Connecticut, the normal home range for a fox is about two to four square miles, but abundance or lack of food supplies can change that

==== Bears (Order Carnivora, Family Ursidae) ====
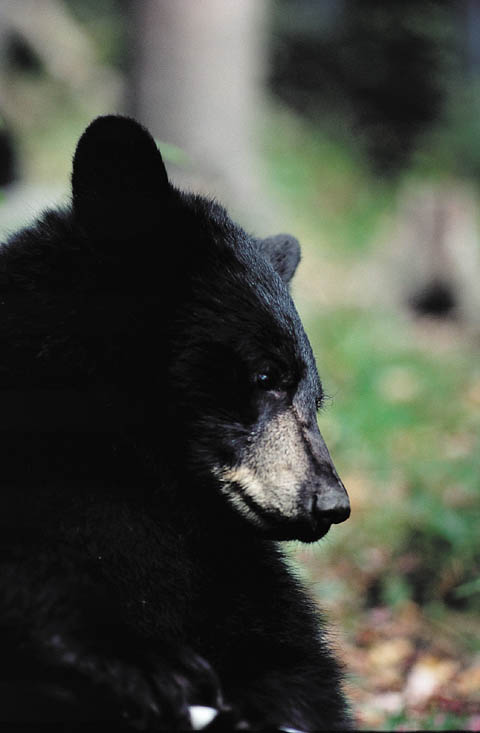
Black bear

- Black bear (Ursus americanus) — rare in most of the state, but fairly common in Litchfield and Hartford counties in the northwestern and north central parts of the state; bears have expanded from their core habitat in the state's northwestern hills, and they have been seen for several years (as of 2010) as far south as Greenwich, in the southwestern corner of the state; in 2002 the population was probably above 100 and growing, Geoffrey Hammerson wrote in Connecticut Wildlife: Biodiversity, Natural History, and Conservation, but state wildlife biologists for the Connecticut Department of Environmental Protection estimated in 2008 that there were more than 300 in the state, with the population growing by about 15 to 20 percent a year. DEP annual bear surveys began in 2001. They were extirpated from the state by 1840, but the DEP had hard evidence of a resident population in the 1980s. Since then sightings have increased dramatically. In 1997, the DEP received about 100 calls reporting bear sightings; in 2007, it received 2,000. The state DEP encourages bear reports on its Web site. Reforestation of the state was the major factor allowing for the reintroduction and expansion of the bear population, and that expansion is expected to continue. State policy is not to remove bears unless the area is urban; the agency seldom relocates bears and only does so within Connecticut, since no other state will accept them. Bears that persistently kill livestock, enter buildings or demonstrate similarly problematic behavior may be killed under state policy. There is no hunting season for bears in the state. In 2023, a black bear stole 60 cupcakes from a bakery in Avon. The DEP asks people who see bears in Connecticut to do the following:
  - "Enjoy it from a distance."
  - "Never attempt to feed or attract bears."
  - "Report bear sightings to the Wildlife Division, at (860) 675-8130."

==== Raccoons and relatives (Order Carnivora, Family Procyonidae) ====
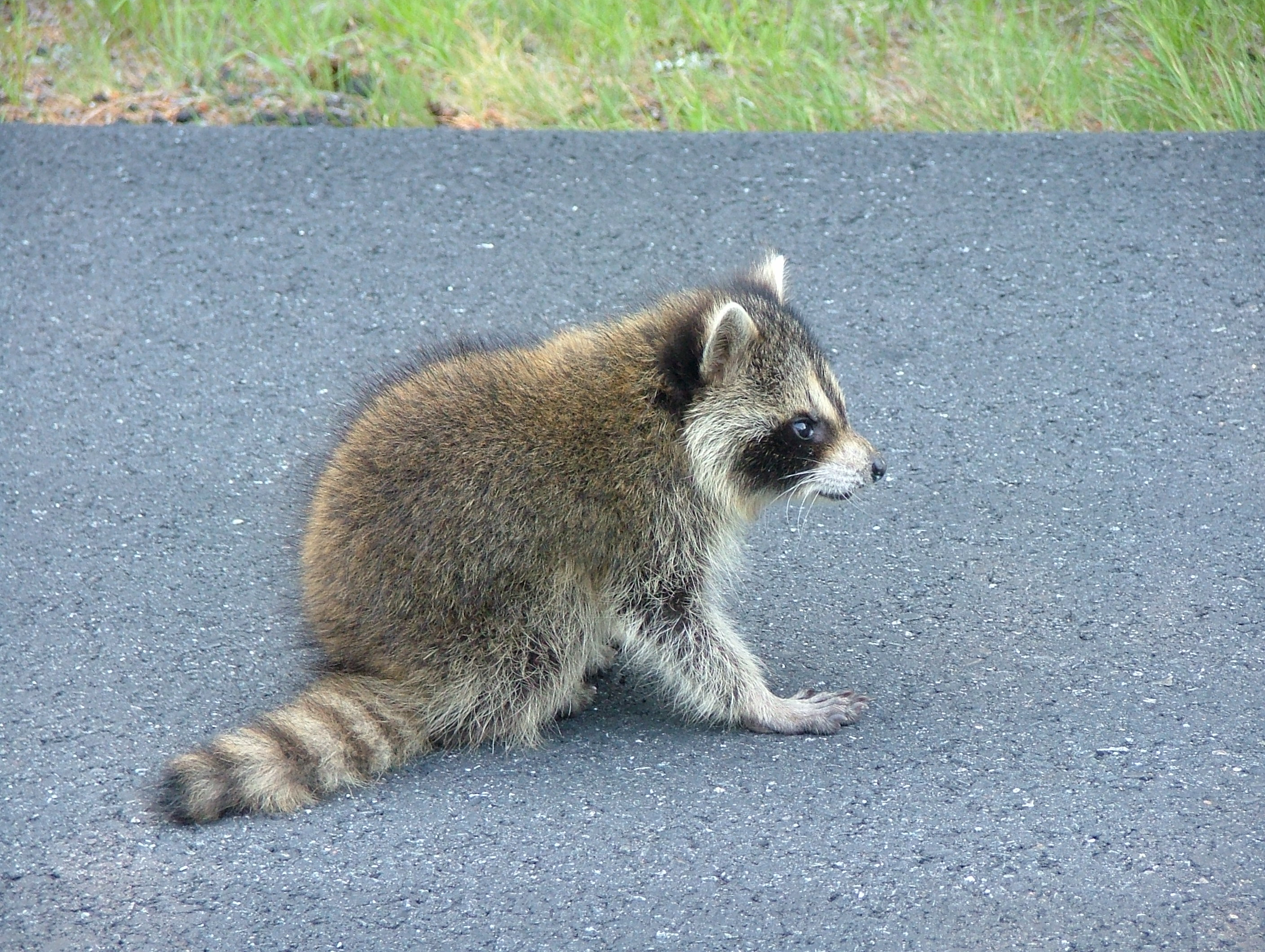
Raccoon

- Raccoon (Procyon lotor) — found near lakes, ponds, marshes and streams; a rabies epidemic devastated the population in the state in the early 1990s, killing as much as 75 percent of the population; raccoon rabies still remains in Connecticut, with about 200 cases a year as of 2004, and including skunk and cat infections as well as raccoons; rabies cases should be reported to police or animal control officials

==== Weasels and otters (Order Carnivora, Family Mustelidae) ====
- River otter (Lontra canadensis) — previously scarce, but now somewhat common in the state; found in many lakes and large ponds
- American marten (Martes americana) — one recent (as of 2004) road-kill in New Hartford, Connecticut (in the north-central to northwest part of the state) was the first certain evidence that the species occurs in Connecticut
- American ermine (Mustela erminea) — Like the long-tailed weasel, fairly common in woods and thickets and near stone walls; especially near rivers and streams
- Long-tailed weasel (Neogale frenata) — Like the ermine, fairly common in woods and thickets and near stone walls; especially near rivers and streams
- Mink (Neogale vison) — rather common in streams, ponds, lakes and marshes

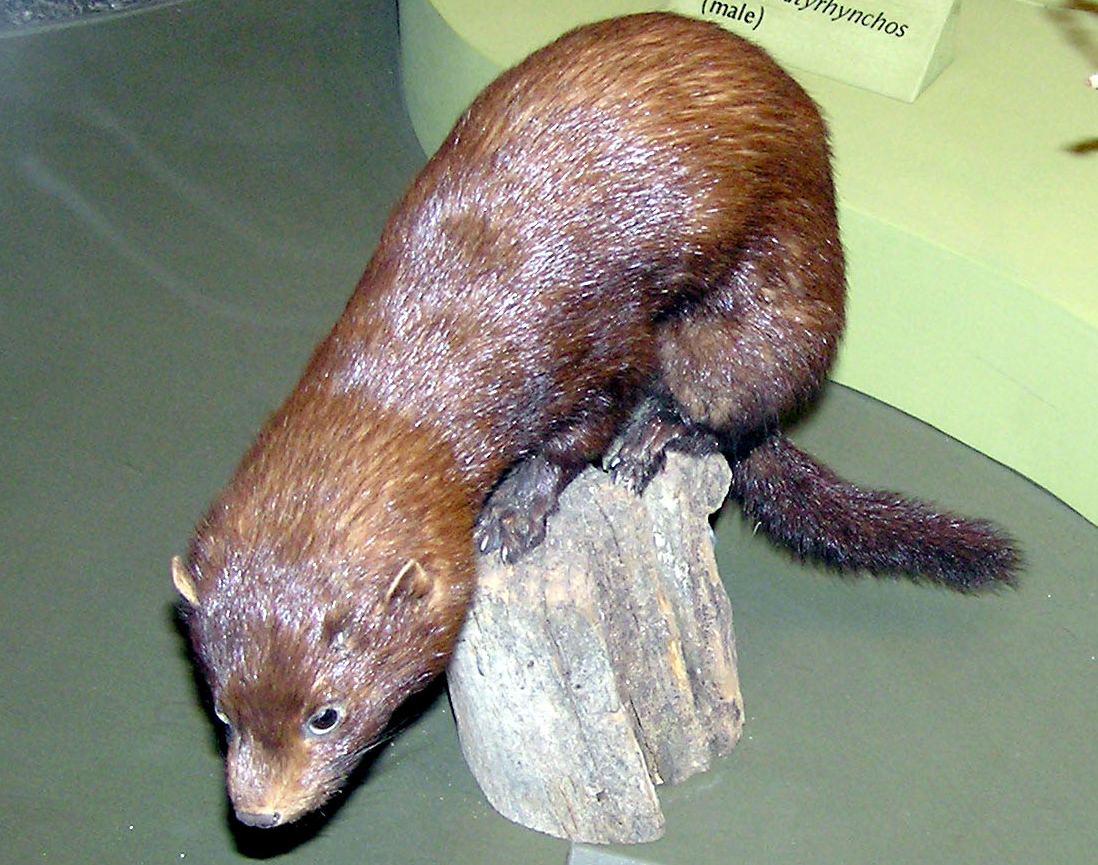
Mink

- Fisher (Pekania pennanti) — Fishers live in large, thickly wooded forests; the species was extirpated from southern New England when forests were cleared and was absent for more than a century. From 1989 to 1991, they were reintroduced from New Hampshire and by 2004 were established in northern Connecticut. Population density is normally no more than one fisher per several hundred acres.

==== Skunks (Order Carnivora, Family Mephitidae) ====
- Striped skunk (Mephitis mephitis) — common in the state and in various habitats

==== Cats (Order Carnivora, Family Felidae) ====
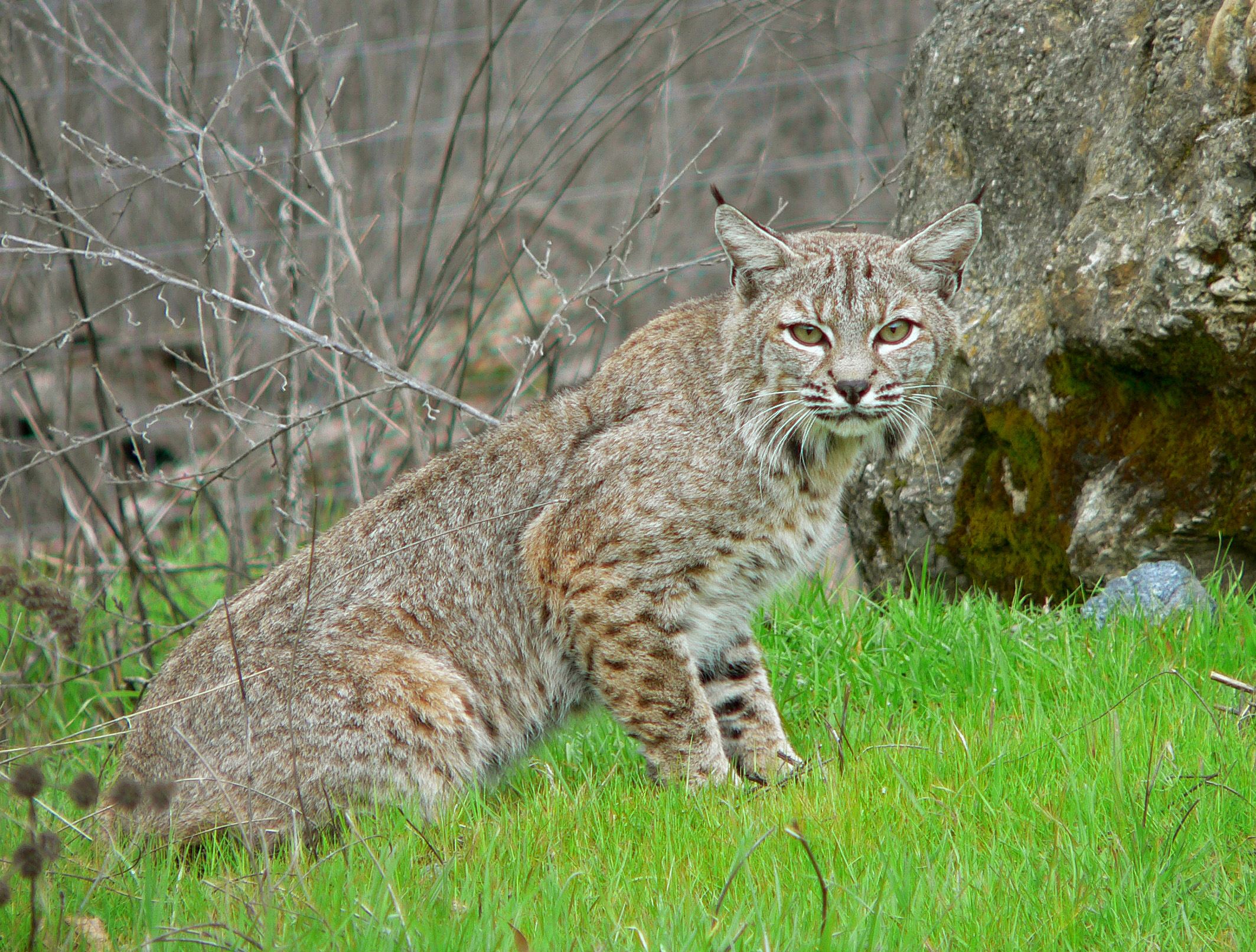
Bobcat

- Canada lynx (Lynx canadensis) — apparently never a permanent resident of the state, but historically it may have been in the state. They are now considered extirpated.
- Bobcat (Lynx rufus) — They favor thickets and patchy woods in the least-developed areas of the state, especially in the northwest highlands of Connecticut; they normally are scarce where coyotes are more prevalent. It is unknown whether or not the burgeoning coyote population has resulted in a decline in bobcats, however. Unlike coyotes, bobcats do not adapt well to nearby human populations; they prefer immature forests with a thick understory. In the 1970s the price of bobcat pelts rose so much that state officials became concerned they would be overharvested and reclassified the bobcat as a protected furbearer, with no hunting or trapping seasons. A rabid bobcat attacked a man in Plainville in 2003, but the incident is regarded as a rare, freak occurrence.
- Cougar (Puma concolor) — There is no firm evidence that the species exists in the state but it may be rare in hilly parts of northern Connecticut. Officially considered extirpated. A state DEEP official documented a live cougar in Durham in October 2011. A cougar was killed on the Wilbur Cross Parkway in Milford in June 2011.

=== Hoofed mammals ===
Deer (Order Artiodactyla, Family Cervidae)

==== White-tailed deer ====
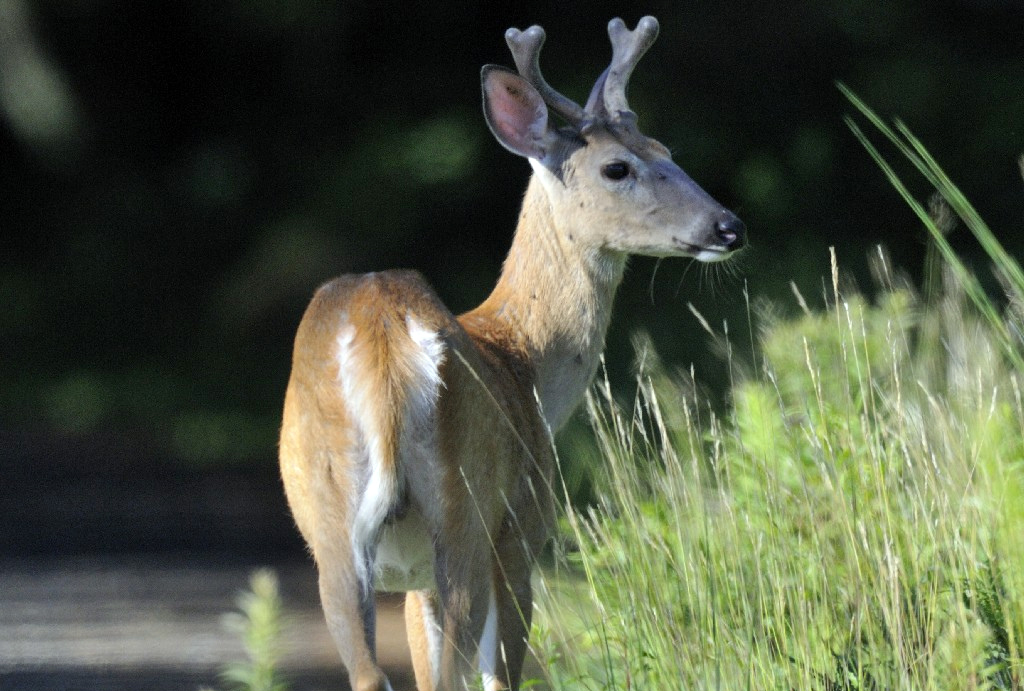
White-tailed deer

White-tailed deer (Odocoileus virginianus) — The population in the state is enormous and growing in large part because of the expansion of rural residential lands that are hospitable for deer but not suitable for hunting. Other factors are the mixture of young and mature forests, milder winters, and fewer predators. Deer were nearly eliminated from the state by the end of the 19th century, with fewer than 20 in all of Connecticut, although they were on the rebound by that point, in part due to state regulations to protect them. In 1907 the state allowed landowners to shoot deer causing crop damage. In 1974, the state passed its first deer management act and regular, licensed deer hunting began the next year. By the 1970s, the total state population was about 20,000, and up to 76,000 (a low estimate) in 2000.

Fairfield County has the highest deer density in the state. According to one estimate, the county has 59 per square mile, more than double the density in the rest of the state, according to the state Department of Environmental Protection. But another estimate, based on a survey in the winter of 2006–2007 estimated only 29.4 deer per square mile in the county. Deer can carry up to 1,000 ticks, many of which have Lyme disease. The state allows bowhunting for deer from September 15 to January 31. (According to an estimate in Connecticut Wildlife, published in 2004, "Winter density ranges up to about 40 per square mile in southwestern Connecticut, with a statewide mean of 21 per square mile.")

Connecticut has several problems associated with its large deer population:

- Motor vehicle accidents: State Farm insurance estimates that more than 10,000 deer in Connecticut are hit by cars each year. But the state Department of Environmental Protection estimates only 3,000 deer-motor vehicle accidents occur annually. State policy is to bury deer carcases by the side of the road where they were hit.
- Lyme disease: Culling the deer population in Groton, Connecticut, by about 90 percent reduced the incidence of new Lyme disease cases in town from about twenty a year to two or three a year.
- Habitat damage: In Greenwich, Connecticut, the Greenwich Audubon Society's 600 acres (2.4 km^{2}) of land have seen deer push out ground birds such as the ovenbird and black and white warbler. The deer have devastated species of plants once abundant on the Audubon group's land and ravaged low-lying vegetation, including hickory and hemlock saplings. Some once-abundant species in the area were completely absent as of late 2007, according to an Audubon official.

==== Moose ====
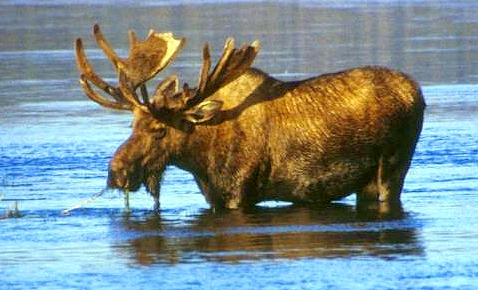
Moose

Moose (Alces alces) — have become more prevalent in Connecticut in recent years, with the first documented reproduction (a female and two calves) found in 2000, and an estimated 100 in the state as of 2007. As of 2015, they come from Massachusetts whose population is rising dramatically over 1000, the population could be over 200 Most of these moose now live in northern Litchfield County, especially the towns of Hartland, Colebrook and Granby. They can occasionally be found throughout northern Litchfield and northwestern Hartford Counties and are known to wander throughout the state. When forests were largely replaced by farmland in the seventeenth through nineteenth centuries, populations of moose (along with animals such as turkeys, black bears and mountain lions) lost their habitats and were greatly reduced or eliminated from the state. But even before Connecticut was settled by Europeans, the moose population was never large, according to the DEP. Moose are thought to be entering the state from the north (but have roamed as far south as Stamford and Fairfield, communities on Long Island Sound). In Massachusetts, three or four moose are hit by trains each year and about 15 motor vehicle collisions with the animals occur, although in some years there have been as many as 50. One Massachusetts environmental official estimated there were about 1000 moose in Massachusetts.

The greatest danger to people from moose is car collisions. From 1995 to 2006, there was an average of one collision a year of a moose and an automobile across the state, although in the first half of 2007, there were four, including one in June on the Merritt Parkway in Stamford. Unlike deer, moose that feel threatened tend to stand their ground. Local police are authorized to kill the animals if they pose a threat to public safety, which in practice almost only means that the animal is getting too close to a highway. In 2007, police killed bull moose in separate incidents in Waterbury and Fairfield when each moose came close to a highway. In cases where no threat to the public seems imminent, DEP officials will usually try to tranquilize the animal or harass them into a nearby woods (sometimes by banging on pots or forming a line to try to scare the animal away). In 2008, state authorities knocked out a year-old female moose in New Britain with a tranquilizer dart and released it on state forest land in northern Connecticut. Moose are generally reclusive, but male moose tend to wander about in the fall, during their mating season, and year-old moose tend to wander when their mothers get ready to give birth to new calves, according to the state Department of Environmental Protection. The 2008 New Britain moose, for example, was thought by officials to be the same animal seen in Avon and Farmington the week before.

==== Elk ====
Eastern elk (Cervus canadensis canadensis) — extinct. Elk are extirpated from the state.

=== Mammals in Long Island Sound ===
For more information on mammals in Long Island sound, see Long Island Sound.

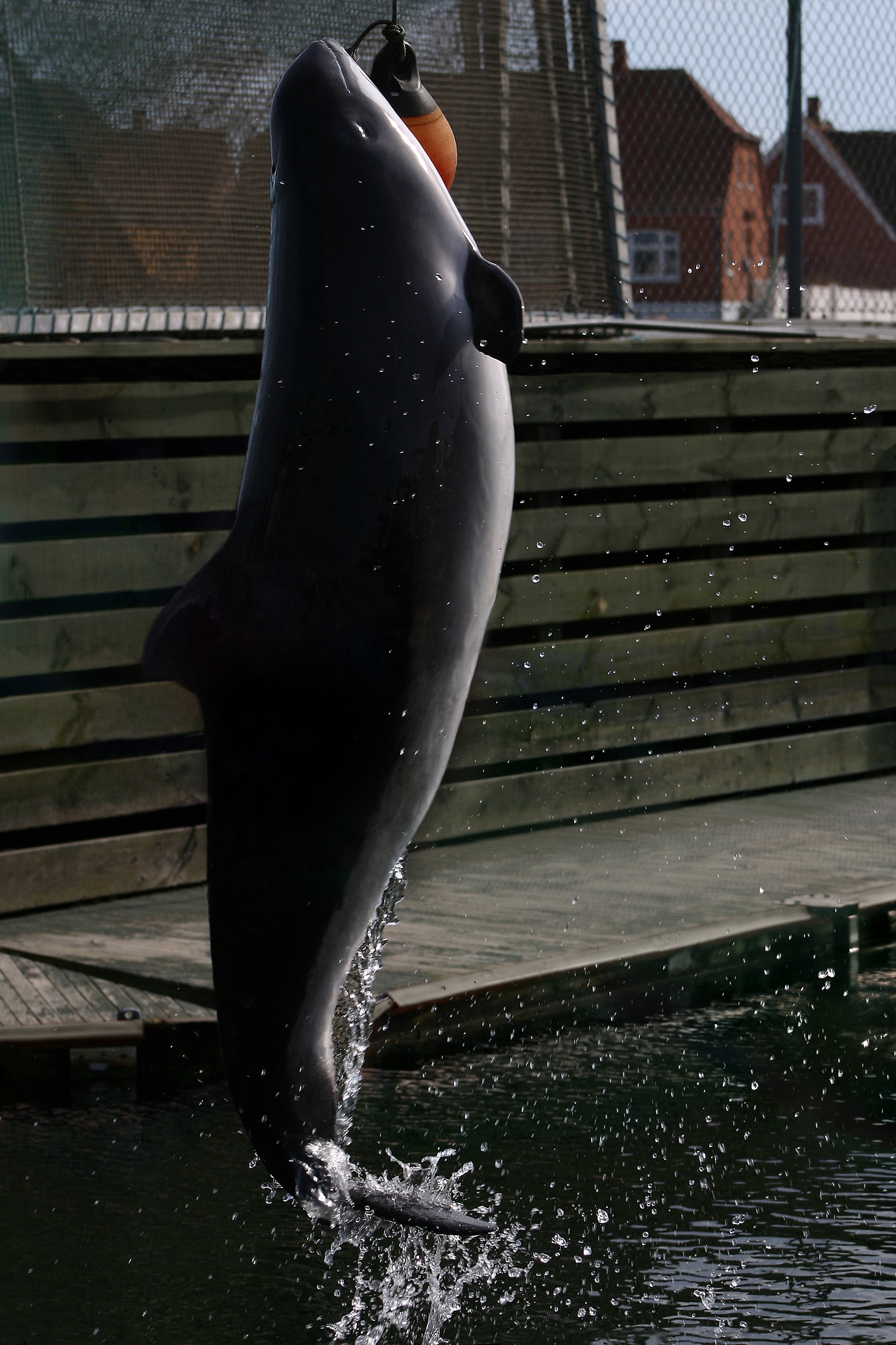
Harbor porpoise

Whales (Order Cetacea, Family Delphinidae)

- Long-finned pilot whale (Globicephala melas) — occasionally enters Long Island Sound; it rarely washes up on the shore in Connecticut.

Porpoises (Order Cetacea, Family Phocoenidae)

- Harbor porpoise (Phocoena phocoena) — rare, but sometimes found off the coast

Seals (Order Carnivora, Family Phocidae)

- Harbor seal (Phoca vitulina) — This is the only marine mammal regularly living in Connecticut; found mostly in the eastern part of the coast (where there were at least several hundred as of 2004), but also in the west; not uncommon around Hammonasset Beach State Park, around Sheffield Island and Smith's Reef in the Norwalk Islands, and they have been spotted off Stamford and Greenwich; found from late fall through mid spring, usually on isolated ledges and rocks; in the past, they may have been permanent residents, but sealers and fishermen who killed the seals to prevent competition probably stopped that; for the warmer months of the year, they migrate to the Maine coast.
- Gray seal (Halichoerus grypus) — occasionally seen in Long Island Sound but usually lives farther north

== See also ==
- Fauna of Connecticut
- List of birds of Connecticut
- Flora of Connecticut
- Long Island Sound for an extensive list of various species
- List of mammals of North America
- Mammals of New England
- Lists of mammals by region
