= Preble's meadow jumping mouse =

Conservation status
- Imperiled (NatureServe)

- Threatened (ESA)

Scientific classification
- Kingdom: Animalia
- Phylum: Chordata
- Class: Mammalia
- Order: Rodentia
- Family: Zapodidae
- Genus: Zapus
- Species: Z. hudsonius
- Subspecies: Z. h. preblei

Trinomial name
- Zapus hudsonius preblei Krutzsch, 1954

Subspecies of mammal

Preble's meadow jumping mouse (Zapus hudsonius preblei) is a subspecies of meadow jumping mouse, endemic to the upland habitats of Colorado and Wyoming in North America. It is found nowhere else in the world. It is listed as Threatened under the United States Endangered Species Act; there is a major debate about whether it is a valid taxon.

== Description ==
The mouse is around nine inches long, 60% of which is the tail, and can jump in bounds of four feet when threatened. It usually travels slowly. It swims and climbs grass stems. It has long hind legs and a long, slender, scaly tail that it uses to communicate by making drumming noises. It also communicates using clucks and chirps.

The mice are born without hair (naked) and live nearly two years. They hibernate an estimated 7–8 months - from September or October through late May or early June - building themselves a soft vegetation nest, typically at a location with a northerly aspect. The Colorado breeding season is believed to be June through August, with two litters - in July and August - but there are records of three litters in a season. The average litter size is five, but can range from two to eight.

Meadow jumping mice like to eat mostly plants, insects, spiders, and slugs.

== Health ==
In June 1998, a preble's meadow jumping mouse was found with a case of Myiasis. The mouse had been parasitized by five grey flesh flies. It is the first report of grey flesh fly Myiasis from the natural wildlife of Colorado.

== Habitat ==
The Preble's meadow jumping mouse has been documented in eleven Wyoming and Colorado counties, as far north as Wyoming's Converse to Colorado's El Paso in the south. In Colorado, known habitat areas include the Rocky Flats National Wildlife Refuge, South Boulder Creek and the St. Vrain Valley. Since the devastating 2013 floods, the mouse has no longer been observed at Rocky Flats; in 2017, surveyors put out 200 traps a night for a week and caught no mice in an area where they had previously caught an average of 44. While South Boulder Creek populations are in decline, St. Vrain Creek mice are doing much better; post-flood restoration has enhanced the habitat with shrubs and trees.
