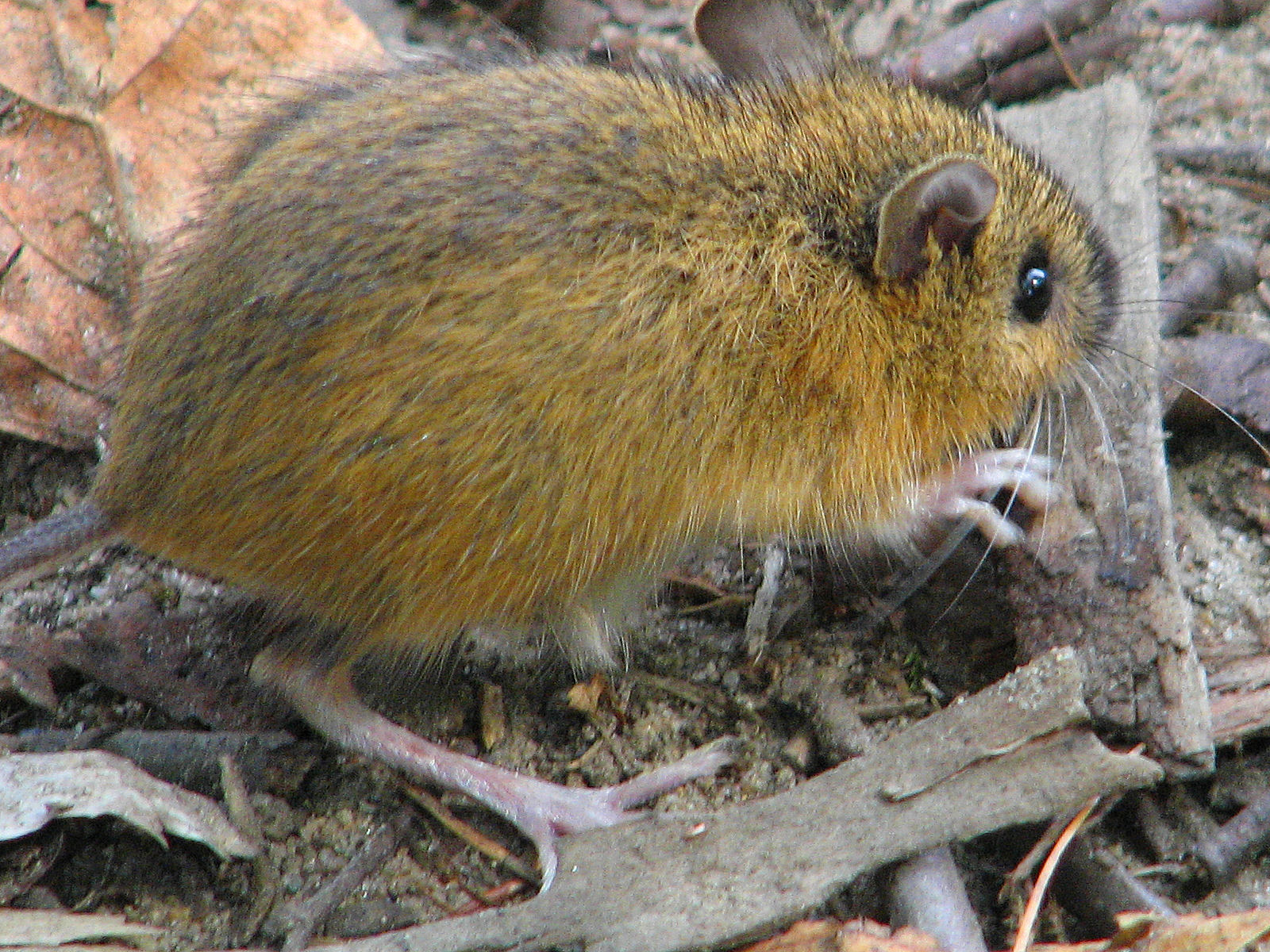

Conservation status
- Least Concern (IUCN 3.1)

Scientific classification
- Kingdom: Animalia
- Phylum: Chordata
- Class: Mammalia
- Infraclass: Placentalia
- Order: Rodentia
- Family: Zapodidae
- Genus: Napaeozapus; Preble, 1899
- Species: N. insignis

Binomial name
- Napaeozapus insignis (G. S. Miller, 1891)
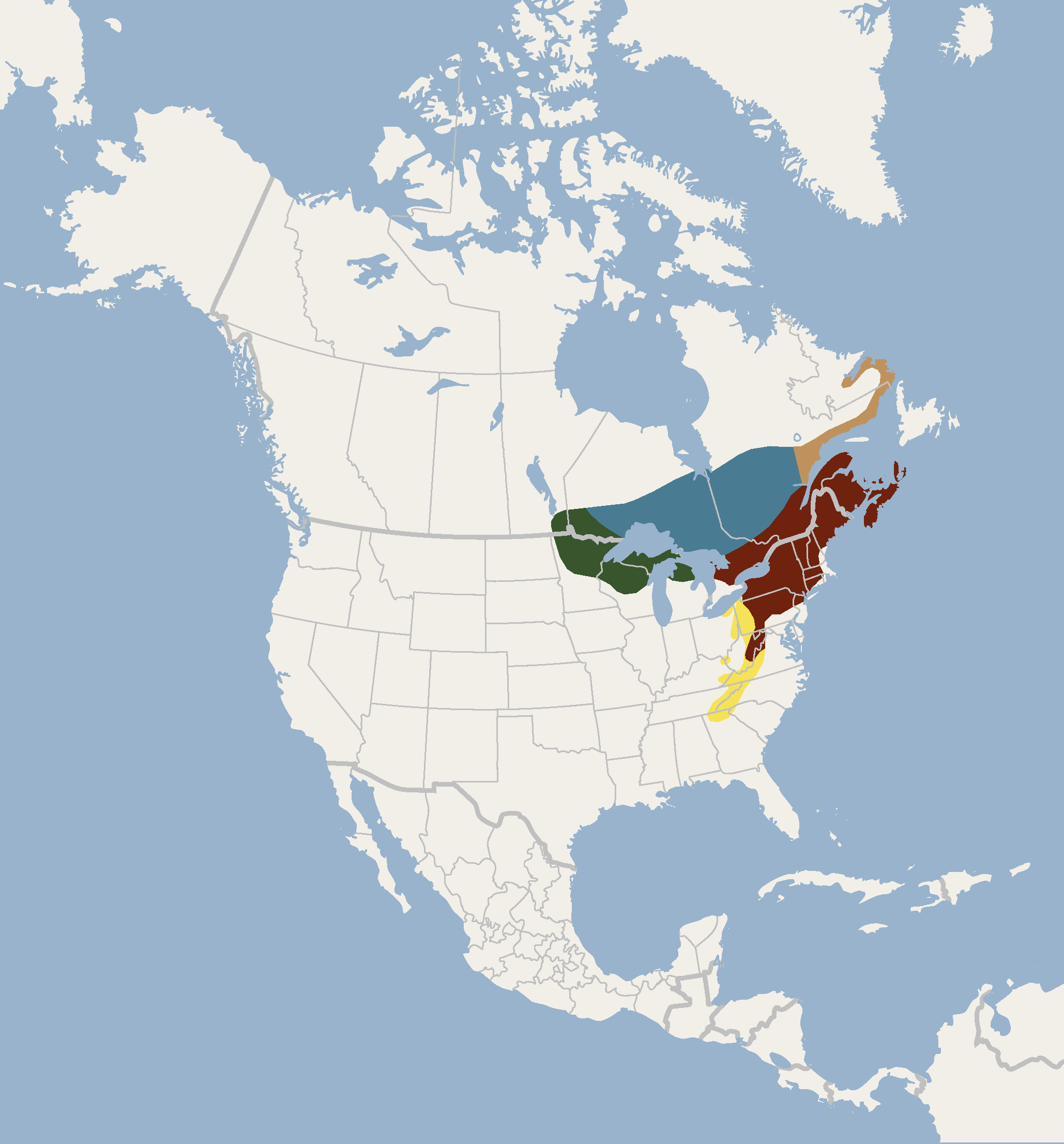

= Woodland jumping mouse =

Woodland jumping mouse Temporal range: Middle Pleistocene to Recent

Species of rodent

The woodland jumping mouse (Napaeozapus insignis) is a species of jumping mouse found in North America. It can jump up to 1 m (3 ft 3 in) using its extremely strong feet and long tail.

== Taxonomy ==
Representatives of the family Dipodidae are found in the northern regions of the Old and New Worlds, and are characterized by very large infraorbital foramen, and, in one of the two North American genera, Zapus, by four upper cheek teeth. Incisors are compressed and deeply grooved. These animals are common and noted for very long tails and long hind legs adapted for leaping. They live in forests, meadows, and swamps and are profound hibernators.

The woodland jumping mouse was originally classified as Zapus insignis in 1891, but differences detected in dental morphology, ear ossicles, and the baculum resulted in the creation of two new genera, Napaeozapus and Eozapus. N. insignis was in the family Dipodidae, in the subfamily Zapodinae, although now Zapodinae is considered its own distinct family, Zapodidae.

=== Subspecies ===
Five subspecies of woodland jumping mice were identified by Whitaker in 1972:

- N. i. insignis in New Brunswick
- N. i. abietorum in Ontario
- N. i. saquenayensis in Quebec
- N. i. roanensis in North Carolina
- N. i. frutectanus in eastern Wisconsin and in Michigan

The subspecies N. i. abietorum is sometimes considered its own distinct species and called the "western woodland jumping mouse", while the nominate subspecies and N. i. roanensis are the "eastern woodland jumping mouse". If it is considered distinct, N. abietorum would include the subspecies N. i. saquenayensis and N. i. frutectanus.

== Distribution and habitat ==
The woodland jumping mouse occurs throughout northeastern North America.

Populations are most dense in cool, moist boreal woodlands of spruce-fir and hemlock-hardwoods where streams flow from woods to meadows with bankside touch-me-nots (Impatiens) and in situations where meadow and forest intermix and water and thick ground cover are available.

== Description ==
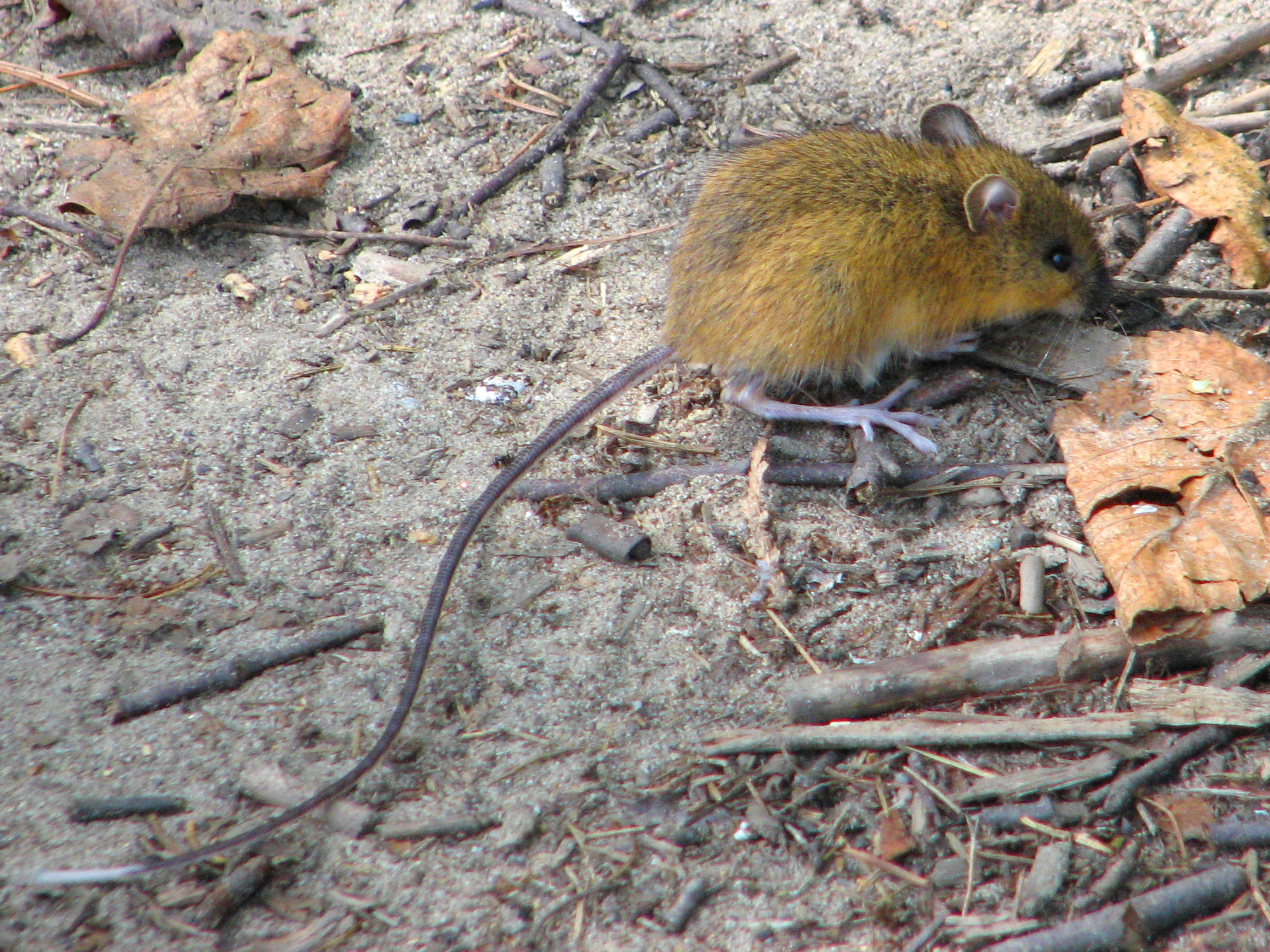
Specimen in Sturgeon River Provincial Park, Ontario, Canada displaying white-tipped tail

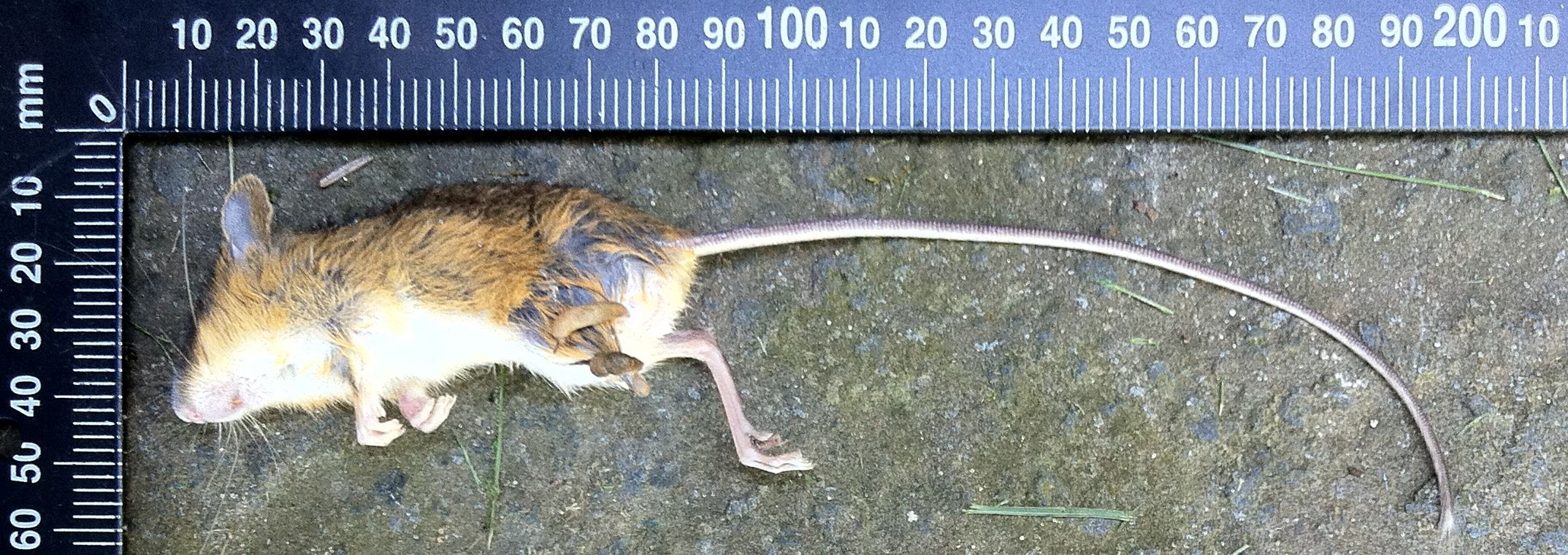
Woodland jumping mouse killed by cat in Sheffield, Vermont, with ruler for scale

The woodland jumping mouse is a medium-sized rodent. The species is darker in the south. The mouse has adaptations to live in cold climate.

The mouse has small, high-crowned skull. Three molariform teeth are present, premolars are absent, and grooved incisors are orange or yellow. Its molars are both rooted and have hypsodont. The tail is dark brown above and creamy white below with a white tip, and is sparsely haired, thin, tapered, and scaly. It is approximately 60% of total body length. Tail length is made possible by long vertebrae. Long bones make it possible for the mouse to leap and jump.

Measurements
| Length (nose to tail tip) | 205–256 mm (8.1–10.1 in) |
| Tail | 115–160 mm (4.5–6.3 in) |
| Weight | 17–35 g (0.60–1.23 oz) |
| Basal metabolic rate | 1.80 cm^3 oxygen/hour (average) |
Measurements of 40 Adults from New York
| Length | 227 mm (8.9 in) 210–249 mm (8.3–9.8 in) |
| Tail | 129.5 mm (5.10 in) 126–152 mm (5.0–6.0 in) |
| Hind foot | 30.2 mm (1.19 in) 28–44 mm (1.1–1.7 in) |
| Weight | May–June: 20 g (0.71 oz); Sept.–Oct., just prior to hibernation: 26.5 g (0.93 oz) |
Measurements of 8 Adults from the Smoky Mountains
| Length | 223 mm (8.8 in) 185–233 mm (7.3–9.2 in) |
| Tail | 140 mm (5.5 in) 120–148 mm (4.7–5.8 in) |
| Hind foot | 29.7 mm (1.17 in) 29–30 mm (1.1–1.2 in) |
diploid number, Tooth Formula, and Mammae
| Diploid number | 72 |
| Tooth formula | 1.0.0.31.0.0.3 = 16 |
| Mamma | 1 pair pectoral; 2 pair abdominal; 1 pair inguinal |
Metabolism
| Typical body temperature | 310ºK (37.0 °C or 98.6 °F) |
| Basal metabolic rate | 0.2200 W (0.0002950 hp) |
| Body mass | 21.8 g (0.77 oz) |
| Metabolic rate per body mass | 0.010092W/g |

== Behavior ==
=== Communication and perception ===
Captive mice are tolerant of others and display little aggression. They are normally silent, but the young squeak and make suckling sounds shortly after birth, and adults make soft clucking sounds while sleeping and just before hibernation. Tactile communication probably exists between mates and between mothers and their young. Like other small rodents, odors and chemical signals are probably emitted or exchanged that identify individuals, that distinguish the sexes, and that indicate the receptiveness of an individual to sexual congress.

=== Diet ===
Diet varies with geographic location and season. One hundred three mice taken in central New York had stomach contents containing the fungi of the genus Endogone and related genera. Endogone is so small the mice presumably locate it by olfaction. Fungi represent about a third of the New York diet, seeds 25%, lepidopterous larvae and various fruits about 10%, and beetles about 7.5%. Touch-me-not seeds are found in the diet. Food is not consumed during hibernation and mice having insufficient fat reserves do not survive.

=== Seasonal activities ===
Summertime is the peak activity period of the woodland jumping mouse. During this time, the mating season begins; mice that re-emerged from hibernation eat much food to restore body weight and fat. Some mice start to hibernate as early as September, but most wait until late November. The mice gather food and fat for more than two weeks before they plan to hibernate. During hibernation, body temperatures usually drop from 37 to 2 °C (99 to 36 °F). Even during their hibernation, they wake up about every two weeks to urinate or eat from their food stashes. Only about 1/3 of all mice that enter hibernation survive; the rest either die from hypothermia or are eaten by predators. Some mice do not enter hibernation, but move to nearby peoples' houses to live inside the walls, in old furniture, or cabinets. They eat scraps or foods that were left over. The mice that do hibernate and survive usually re-emerge around April.

=== Shelter ===
The woodland jumping mouse will live in either nests or burrows. The nests are usually found in hollow logs, under roots of trees or under rocks. The burrows can be found almost anywhere, although they are usually by a plant that can cover the entrance. Their nests are made from soft grasses, reeds and leaves. The burrows usually have multiple chambers, each one dug for a different reason. There is usually a room filled with nesting materials such as grass, reeds and leaves, which is used for sleeping or hibernation. Second, most mice have a room where they store and horde food for hibernation. And finally, there is, in most cases and room with some nesting material for mating, and where the juveniles will be nursed.

Little is known about territory size and territorial behavior because observation is difficult in the wild. Males are thought to have home ranges between 0.4–3.6 ha (0.99–8.90 acres) and females between 0.4–2.6 ha (0.99–6.42 acres) with ranges of the sexes overlapping. High numbers of mice are attracted to sudden and temporary food supplies (such as ripened berries) but what appears to be a colony established in the vicinity of the food may only be a temporary camp while the supply lasts. In favorable habitat, the average population density is about 7.5 per ha, though population density estimates range though from 0.64 to 59 per ha.

=== Reproduction ===
The mating season occurs in May, with gestation about 29 days to three to six pink-skinned and hairless young. The eyes open about the 26th day, weaning occurs about the 30th day, and by the 34th the young look like adults.

The mating season for the woodland jumping mouse starts at the beginning of summer (May) and ends at the end of summer (August). Females usually have 2 or more litters a year, each containing 1–12 juveniles. The female nurses the young while the male gets food to feed the young. The young first leave the nest after 16 days, leaving permanently after 34 days or less. About 90% of young are eaten, every 1 out of 10 lives.

Parental care is little understood because observation in the wild is difficult and females in captivity normally commit infanticide shortly after giving birth. Parental care devolves upon the female rather than the male whose role in care of the young is unknown. Mothers and their young share the nest and mothers have been observed covering its entrance during the day. The young have a longer developmental period than most small rodents, and parental care consequently covers a longer period in comparison with other small rodents.

Life history traits (averages)
| Female sexual maturity | 256 days |
| Male sexual maturity | Unknown |
| Gestation | 29 days |
| Weaning | 36 days |
| Litter size | 4 (viviparous) |
| Litters per year | 1.3 |
| Weight at birth | 0.9 g (0.032 oz) |
| Weight at weaning | 8.9 g (0.31 oz) |
| Sexual dimorphism | None;Females larger |
| Adult weight | 25 g (0.88 oz) |
| Postnatal growth rate | 0.0277 days-1 (from Gompertz function) |

=== Survival ===
Eastern screech owls, timber rattlesnakes, bobcats, broad-banded copperheads, American mink, weasels, and striped skunks are known predators.

The mouse probably has a lifespan of two years but some may live for three or four years.

== Conservation ==
The woodland jumping mouse has no conservational status on the IUCN Red List, United States Federal List, or CITES. No major threats exist at present (2010) but land development reduces suitable habitat for species hibernation, and insufficient layers of insulating snowfall may result in high death rates during the winter. Southern populations are already confined to higher elevations in their range and are threatened by rising temperatures. More research is needed to evaluate and assess current distribution, species abundance, and potential effects of threats. No conservation measures have been undertaken at present to address specific needs of populations in state and national parks. The IUCN has listed the species as Least Concern, because the mouse is common and widespread, populations are considered stable, and no major threats exist at present.
