= Chinese jumping mouse =

Chinese jumping mouse Temporal range: Late Miocene - Recent

Conservation status
- Least Concern (IUCN 3.1)

Scientific classification
- Kingdom: Animalia
- Phylum: Chordata
- Class: Mammalia
- Order: Rodentia
- Family: Zapodidae
- Genus: Eozapus; Preble, 1899
- Species: E. setchuanus

Binomial name
- Eozapus setchuanus (Pousargues, 1896)
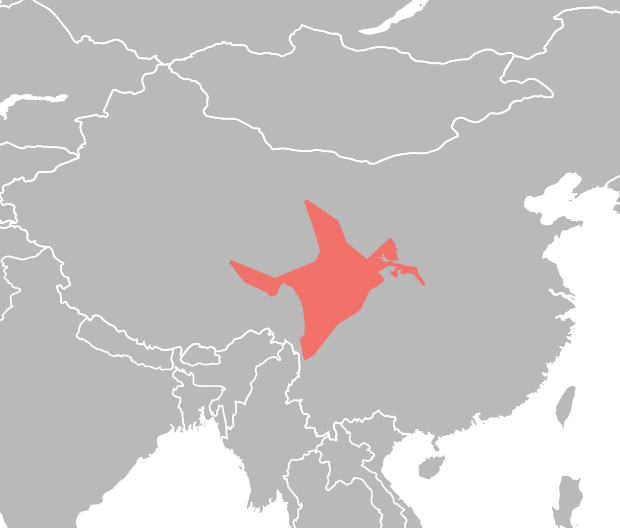
- Eozapus setchuanus distribution

Species of rodent

The Chinese jumping mouse (Eozapus setchuanus) is a species of rodent in the family Dipodidae. It is monotypic within the genus Eozapus. It is endemic to China where its natural habitat is temperate forests, steppes and meadows in mountainous regions. It is tolerant of some degree of habitat destruction, and the International Union for Conservation of Nature has assessed its conservation status as being of "least concern".

== Description ==
The Chinese jumping mouse has a head-and-body length of between 70 and 100 mm (2.8 and 3.9 in) and a tail of 115 to 144 mm (4.5 to 5.7 in). The dorsal fur has a band of dark brown running along the spine but is otherwise a reddish-brown or ochraceous colour, the flanks are pale reddish-brown and the underparts are white. In the nominate subspecies, E. s. setchuanus, there is a narrow brown mid-ventral stripe, but in E. s. vicinus the belly is entirely white. The hind limbs are much longer than the fore limbs, and this mouse moves about by crawling or by a series of short hops. The long tail is sparsely clad with short hair, has a white tip, and is otherwise greyish-brown above and white below.

== Distribution and habitat ==
The Chinese jumping mouse is endemic to central China where it occurs in the provinces of Qinghai, Sichuan, Yunnan, Gansu, Ningxia and Shaanxi. It is a mountain species, occurring at altitudes between about 3,000 and 4,000 m (10,000 and 13,000 ft). It is found in forests, on shrubby steppes and in Alpine meadows. It often lives in cool wooded areas near streams and can also be found in deforested areas where undergrowth develops. It mainly feeds on green plant material.

== Status ==
The Chinese jumping mouse has a wide range and is presumed to have a large total population. The population trend is unknown, but no particular threats to the animal have been detected, it lives in a number of protected areas and is tolerant of habitat disturbance. Any decline in total population is likely to be small and the International Union for Conservation of Nature has assessed the mouse's conservation status as being of "least concern".

== See also ==
- List of endangered and protected species of China
