= Zapus =

Zapus Temporal range: Early Pliocene to Recent
- Zapus hudsonius preblei

Scientific classification
- Kingdom: Animalia
- Phylum: Chordata
- Class: Mammalia
- Order: Rodentia
- Family: Zapodidae
- Genus: Zapus; Coues, 1875

Type species
- Dipus hudsonius/ Zimmermann, 1780

Species
- Zapus hudsonius Zapus luteus Zapus montanus Zapus oregonus Zapus pacificus Zapus princeps Zapus saltator Zapus trinotatus
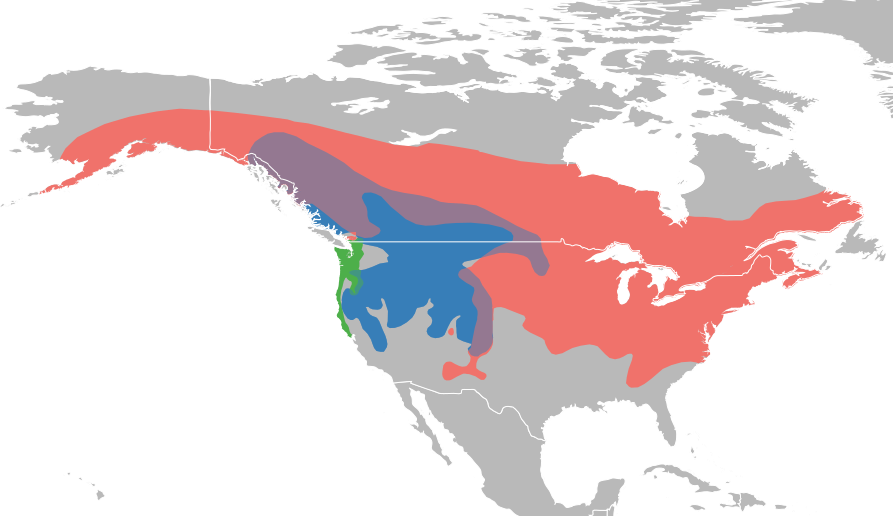
- Zapus distribution. Z. princeps in blue, Z. trinotatus in green, Z. hudsonius in red.

Genus of rodents

Zapus is a genus of North American jumping mouse. It is the only genus whose members have the dental formula 1.0.1.31.0.0.3. Zapus are the only extant mammals aside from the Aye-aye with a total of 18 teeth.

This genus was first separated from Old World jerboas by Coues in 1875. Members of this genus are very similar in appearance, all species having long tails, long hind feet and yellowish-brown pelage above and white below, the colors distinctly separated by a yellowish-orange lateral line.

== Taxonomy ==
The genus contains eight extant species. At least some of these subspecies designations are thought to be tenuous:

- Northern meadow jumping mouse, Zapus hudsonius
  - Zapus hudsonius acadicus
  - Zapus hudsonius adamsi
  - Zapus hudsonius alascensis
  - Zapus hudsonius americanus
  - Zapus hudsonius campestris
  - Zapus hudsonius canadensis
  - Zapus hudsonius hudsonius
  - Zapus hudsonius preblei
  - Zapus hudsonius transitionalis
- Southern meadow jumping mouse, Zapus luteus
  - Zapus luteus luteus
  - Zapus luteus pallidus
- Central Pacific jumping mouse, Zapus montanus
  - Zapus montanus eureka
  - Zapus montanus montanus
  - Zapus montanus orarius (Pt. Reyes Jumping Mouse?)
- Oregon jumping mouse, Zapus oregonus
  - Zapus oregonus cinereus
  - Zapus oregonus curtatus
  - Zapus oregonus oregonus
- South Pacific jumping mouse, Zapus pacificus
- Western jumping mouse, Zapus princeps
  - Zapus princeps chysogenys
  - Zapus princeps princeps
- Northwestern jumping mouse, Zapus saltator
  - Zapus saltator saltator
  - Zapus saltator idahoensis
  - Zapus saltator kootenayensis
  - Zapus saltator minor
- North Pacific jumping mouse, Zapus trinotatus

The Okanogan Valley jumping mouse (Zapus okanoganensis), which is restricted to the Okanogan Valley and the eastern slopes of the Cascade Range, was described in 2017. Although it is definitely thought to be a distinct species, it has not yet been properly published and is thus considered a nomen nudum, and is tentatively classified in Z. saltator until that happens. A number of fossil species are also known, with the oldest being Zapus rinkeri from the Blancan of Kansas.

== In popular culture ==
The Linux distribution Ubuntu named its version 17.04 after the small creature, giving it the codename Zesty Zapus.
