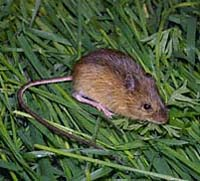

Conservation status
- Least Concern (IUCN 3.1)

Scientific classification
- Kingdom: Animalia
- Phylum: Chordata
- Class: Mammalia
- Infraclass: Placentalia
- Order: Rodentia
- Family: Zapodidae
- Genus: Zapus
- Species: Z. trinotatus

Binomial name
- Zapus trinotatus Rhoads, 1895

Synonyms
- Z. eureka A. B. Howell, 1920; Z. montanus Merriam, 1897; Z. orarius Preble, 1899

= Pacific jumping mouse =

Species of rodent

The Pacific jumping mouse (Zapus trinotatus) is a species of rodent in the family Zapodidae. Found in Canada and the United States, its natural habitats are temperate grassland and swamps.

== Description ==
Pacific jumping mice can be distinguished from other rodents that belong to the same genus by their larger size. They have a distinct color separation between the back and underside. Other distinctive features of the Pacific jumping mouse, especially in contrast to the Western jumping mouse, include ears fringed with light brown fur or with fur that matches the back.

These rodents prefer to live in moist habitats and are frequently found in riparian or meadow areas near rivulets. They rely on grass seeds as their main diet, and thus they prefer inhabiting areas with thick vegetation, which provide refuge from predators as well as food resources. Besides eating grass, they feed also on fungi and insects. They spend most of the autumn season fattening up in preparation for winter hibernation, which is spent in small burrows in the ground. When their hibernation period of up to 8 months is over, they mate and produce a litter of 4 or more young. Pacific jumping mice have many predators, including snakes, coyotes, owls, and foxes.

== Distribution ==
Pacific jumping mice prefer living in moist regions, such as marshes with alder, salmonberry, skunk-cabbage, and riparian alder ecosystems commonly found in coastal redwood woodlands. In northern regions they dwell in dense woodlands, wet grassy regions, and alpine meadows of the Cascade Mountains in Washington and the Olympic Peninsula. These mice can be found in marshy thickets, woodlands edges that contain both weedy understory and ferns, and in meadows.

== Habitat ==
The habitat of Pacific jumping mice includes streams, brushlands, lakes, woodlands, forests, fields, swamps, meadows, shrubs, bogs, marshes, and the banks of rivers and ponds. Their range covers the entire Pacific Northwest, California, and western Canada.

== Diet ==
The diet of Pacific jumping mice include fungi, fish, insects, mollusks, wild fruits, seeds, and wild berries. They forage for food material at ground level and will cut down tall plants to reach seeds. Other behaviors include cutting grass and leaving it in an orderly pile, but they do not store food. The dental formula of Zapus trinotatus is 1.0.1.31.0.0.3 = 18.

== Behavior ==
Infant Pacific jumping mice vocalize in sharp squeals. Mature mice evade predators by leaping distances of over 150 cm; they leap with their head turned downwards, arching their back and diving on the ground while at the same time preparing to make another leap. They may also evade predation by remaining motionless and depending on the camouflage effect of their fur. They are most active from dusk until dawn. They feed by seizing food with their forepaws. Their behavior is typically nervous and high-strung, and they can be aggressive when trapped. However, despite showing some signs of aggressiveness, the Pacific jumping mouse is naturally gentle. When engaged in fighting, they produce a characteristic squeaking noise and at the same time pulsate their tails against the substrate, thus producing a drumming noise. When this rodent is agitated, it jumps and moves madly from one place to another. Pacific jumping mice prepare for summer by constructing a fragile domed-shaped nest with a single entrance, usually placed on the ground.

== Reproduction ==
Pacific jumping mouse sexually mature the year after they are born. Males become sexually active in May or June, which is when females are also fertile. Their gestation period lasts about 18–23 days and give birth in July or August. Each litter consist of about 4-8 young, which are weaned after 4 weeks. The Pacific jumping mouse are born pink and hairless, and weigh around 0.7–0.9 grams at birth. They are also born with their eyes shut and depend on their mother to survive the first few weeks. They become independent after about a month.

== Genetic makeup ==
The genetic makeup of a given population of Pacific jumping mice depends on their mating system, characteristics of the species, demography, and dispersal. However the following three components seem to be important to the genetic health of the Pacific jumping mouse. The first component is behavioral instigation of dispersal. The second component is the significance of species dispersal as an initiator of migrating patterns that also include mating selections. The third component is the impact of dispersion on gender-specific models of species relatedness, and thus, on allelic allotment within the population.

== See also ==
"E-Fauna BC: Electronic Atlas of the Wildlife of British Columbia". BC Species and Ecosystems Explorer. Department of Geography, UBC.
