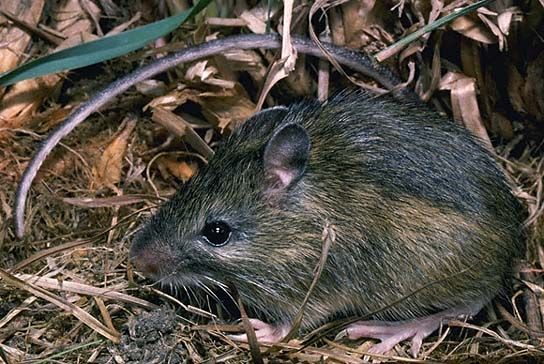

Conservation status
- Least Concern (IUCN 3.1)

Scientific classification
- Kingdom: Animalia
- Phylum: Chordata
- Class: Mammalia
- Order: Rodentia
- Family: Zapodidae
- Genus: Zapus
- Species: Z. princeps

Binomial name
- Zapus princeps J. A. Allen, 1893

= Western jumping mouse =

Species of rodent

The western jumping mouse (Zapus princeps), is a species of rodent in the family Zapodidae. It is found in Canada and the United States.

Western jumping mice evolved during the Pleistocene, possibly from the fossil species Zapus burti, which is known from the late Blancan. Their closest relatives appear to be Pacific jumping mice, with which they can still interbreed to produce fertile offspring.

== Description ==
Western jumping mice resemble typical mice in appearance, but with long hind-feet and reduced forelimbs. They range from 22 to 25 cm (8.7 to 9.8 in) in total length, including a tail 13 to 15 cm (5.1 to 5.9 in) long, and weigh from 17 to 40 g (0.60 to 1.41 oz). The mouse has coarse, dark-greyish-brown fur over the upper body, with a broad yellow to red band along the flanks, and pale yellowish-white underparts. Some individuals have white spots on the upper body, or on the tip of the tail. The two sexes are similar in appearance and size; females have four pairs of teats.

== Distribution and habitat ==
Western jumping mice are found in western North America from Yukon to New Mexico. They inhabit mountainous terrain with moderately damp climates, in meadows and forests dominated by alder, aspen, or willow. They are commonly found in areas of dense vegetation close to fresh water.

Eleven subspecies are currently recognised:

- Zapus princeps princeps – eastern Wyoming, Colorado, northern New Mexico
- Z. p. chrysogenys – La Sal Mountains
- Z. p. cinereus – southeastern Idaho and northwestern Utah
- Z. p. curtatus – northwestern Nevada
- Z. p. idahoensis – northern Idaho, western Montana, central Wyoming
- Z. p. kootenayensis – southern British Columbia, northwestern Washington
- Z. p. minor – from southern Alberta to northeastern South Dakota
- Z. p. oregonus – Oregon, southeastern Idaho, northern Nevada
- Z. p. pacificus – northern California
- Z. p. saltator – British Columbia to southern Yukon
- Z. p. utahensis – Utah and western Wyoming

== Biology ==
Western jumping mice are omnivores, with the largest part of their diet consisting of the seeds of grasses and herbs. Less important food items include fruits, fungi, and insects. Population densities range from 2 to 39 per hectare (0.81 to 15.78/acre), with individual mice having home ranges between 0.1 to 0.6 hectares (0.25 to 1.48 acres), with males generally having larger ranges than females. The feeding grounds of mice can be identified by small piles of grass stems stripped of their seeds, and by the presence of clear runways strewn with grass clippings. Their nests are constructed from grass fragments, and are concealed beneath vegetation or debris.

The mice are nocturnal, but are only active for the summer months, hibernating for the rest of the year. In at least some areas, they spend between eight and ten months of the year hibernating. They subsist entirely on their fat reserves while dormant, and do not cache food; a typical mouse may lose 25% of its body weight during the eight to ten months of its hibernation. However, the hibernation is not continuous throughout this period, with the mice waking, on average, once every 38 days.

The timing of hibernation is related to the weather conditions, with mice entering their dens following the first snowfall, if they have not already done so earlier in the year. They awake once the ground temperature reaches 8 to 9.5 °C (46.4 to 49.1 °F)

Predators include bobcats, weasels, skunks, raccoons, snakes and birds of prey. The mice flee predators by making a rapid series of long jumps, interspersed with short periods when they freeze in place. Although they normally move by making short hops and occasional leaps of up to 36 cm (14 in), when startled, their leaps may reach 72 cm (28 in) along the ground, and 30 cm (12 in) into the air.

== Reproduction ==
Female western jumping mice enter estrus within one week of emerging from the hibernation, and typically breed only once each year. Gestation lasts for eighteen days, and results in the birth of a litter of four to eight young. The pups are born blind and hairless, weighing about 0.8 g (0.03 oz). They are weaned between 28 and 35 days of age.

They are apparently able to breed by the time they complete their first hibernation, although only around 40% do so, with the remainder waiting for a further year. They live for three to four years.
