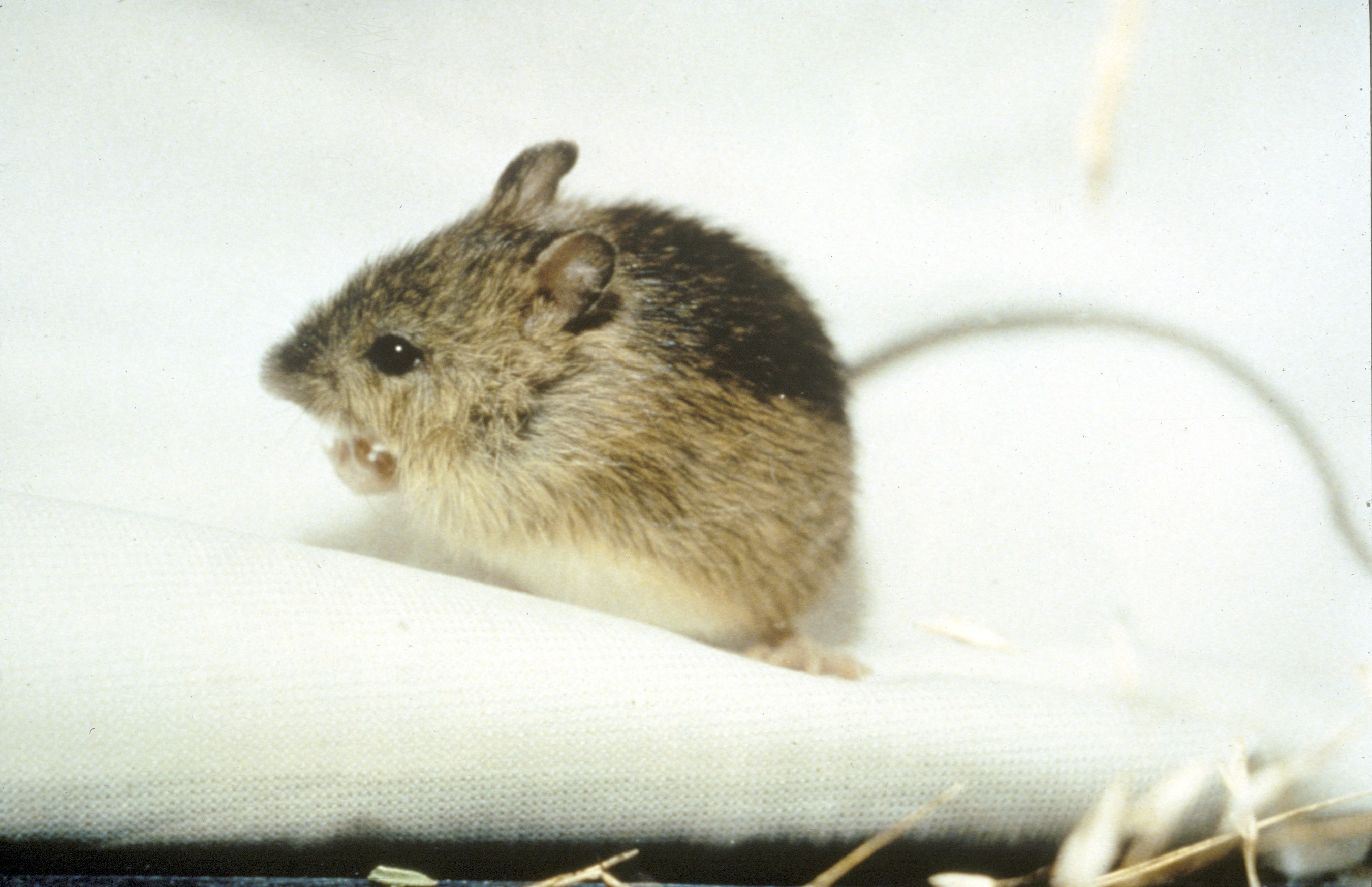
- Zapus hudsonius preblei

Scientific classification
- Kingdom: Animalia
- Phylum: Chordata
- Class: Mammalia
- Order: Rodentia
- Superfamily: Dipodoidea
- Family: Zapodidae; Coues, 1875

Genera
- Eozapus; Napaeozapus; Zapus
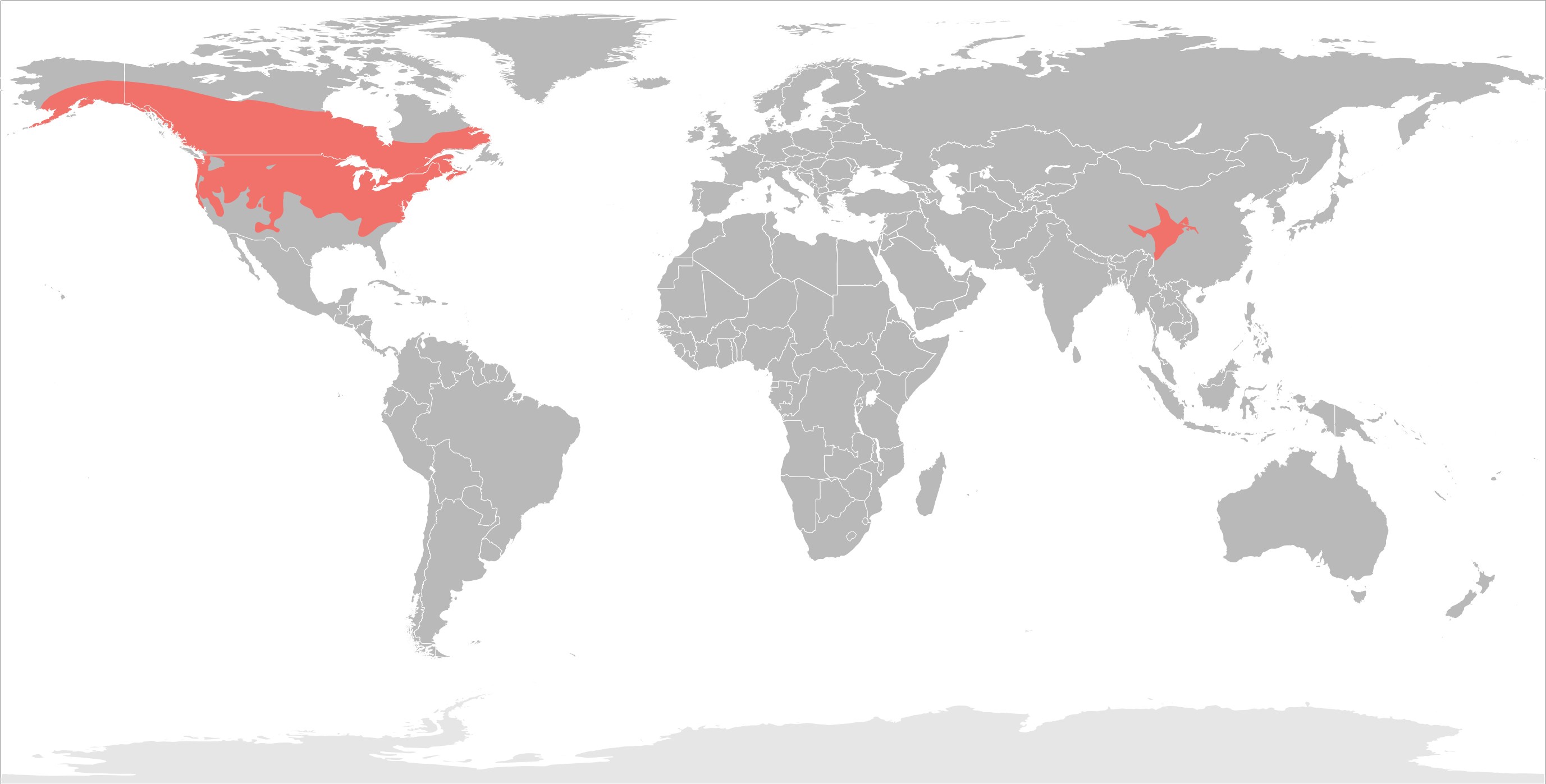
- Zapodidae distribution

Synonyms
- Zapodinae

= Zapodidae =

Zapodidae Temporal range: Early Miocene–recent

Family of rodents

Zapodidae, the jumping mice, is a family of mouse-like rodents in North America and China.

Although mouse-like in general appearance, these rodents are distinguished by their elongated hind limbs, and, typically, by the presence of four pairs of cheek-teeth in each jaw. There are five toes to all the feet, but the first in the fore-feet is rudimentary, and furnished with a flat nail. The tail makes up about 60% of its body length and is used to gain balance while jumping. The cheeks have pouches. The Sichuan jumping "yeti" mouse (Eozapus setchuanus) from China can be identified by the ‘Y’ marking on its belly.

Jumping mice live in wooded areas, grassy fields and alpine meadows. When disturbed, they can leap eight to ten feet at a time, diminishing to three to four as they widen the gap between them and any pursuer. They are nocturnal and generally live alone. Nests are often found in clefts of rocks, among timber, or in hollow trees. Typically, they will have two to three litters per year.

== Taxonomy ==
Formerly classified in the subfamily Zapodinae alongside the birch mice and jerboas within the greater family Dipodidae, phylogenetic analysis has found the jumping mice, birch mice, and jerboas to each form their own family, with Dipodidae being restricted to the jerboas. All three families are thought to belong to the greater superfamily Dipodoidea.

== Classification ==
There are 11 recent species listed by the American Society of Mammalogists as of 2021.

Family Zapodidae, jumping mice

- Genus Eozapus
  - Chinese jumping mouse, Eozapus setchuanus
- Genus Napaeozapus
  - Western woodland jumping mouse, Napaeozapus abietorum
  - Eastern woodland jumping mouse, Napaeozapus insignis
- Genus Zapus
  - Northern meadow jumping mouse, Zapus hudsonius
  - Southern meadow jumping mouse, Zapus luteus
  - Central Pacific jumping mouse, Zapus montanus
  - Oregon jumping mouse, Zapus oregonus
  - South Pacific jumping mouse, Zapus pacificus
  - Southwestern jumping mouse, Zapus princeps
  - Northwestern jumping mouse, Zapus saltator
  - North Pacific jumping mouse, Zapus trinotatus

=== Fossil genera ===
In addition, four fossil genera are also definitively known:

- Genus †Javazapus
- Genus †Pliozapus
- Genus †Sinozapus
- Genus †Sminthozapus

== See also ==
- Hopping mouse: a murid rodent native to Australia
- Jerboa: a related desert-dwelling dipodid rodent native to northern Africa and Asia
- Kangaroo mouse and kangaroo rat: heteromyid rodents of North America
- Kultarr: an unrelated marsupial with a similar body plan and coloration; an example of convergence
- Springhare: a pedetid rodent native to southern and eastern Africa
