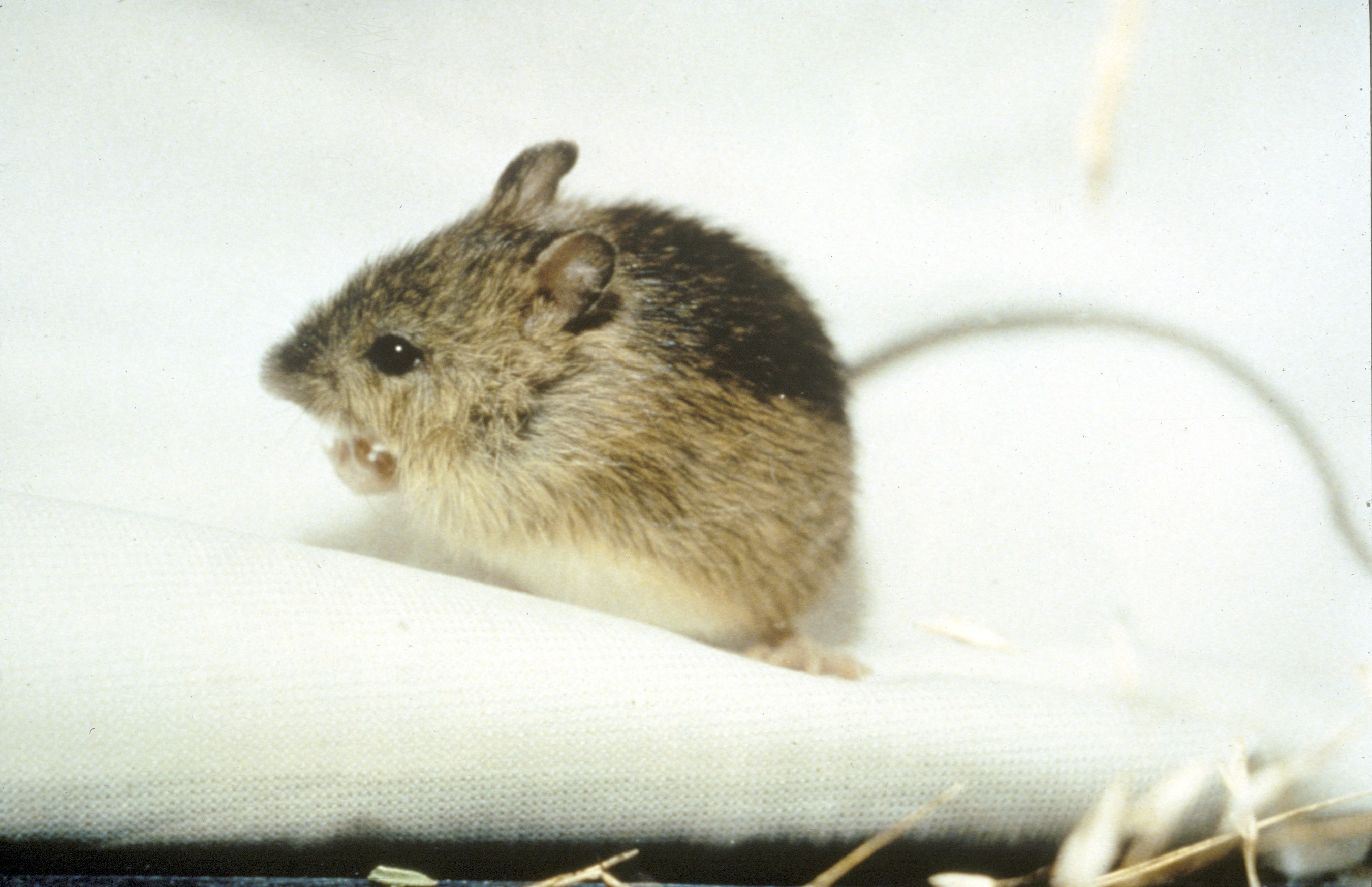

Conservation status
- Least Concern (IUCN 3.1)

Scientific classification
- Kingdom: Animalia
- Phylum: Chordata
- Class: Mammalia
- Order: Rodentia
- Family: Zapodidae
- Genus: Zapus
- Species: Z. hudsonius

Binomial name
- Zapus hudsonius (Zimmermann, 1780)

Synonyms
- Dipus hudsonius (Zimmermann, 1780); Sorex dichrurus (Rafinesque, 1833)

= Meadow jumping mouse =

Meadow jumping mouse Temporal range: Middle Miocene–Recent

Species of rodent

The meadow jumping mouse (Zapus hudsonius) is the most widely distributed mouse in the family Zapodidae. Its range extends from the Atlantic coast in the east to the Great Plains west, and from the arctic tree lines in Canada and Alaska to the north, and Georgia, Alabama, Arizona, and New Mexico to the south. In mid-2014, the New Mexico subspecies of the meadow jumping mouse, Zapus hudsonius luteus, was listed as an endangered species under the federal Endangered Species Act.

== Description ==
The meadow jumping mouse can range in length, from 180 mm to 240 mm, with its tail taking credit for most of its length, usually about 108 mm to 165 mm. A distinct characteristic about this species is its enlarged hind feet, which can be 28 to 35 mm long, and relatively short forelimbs. This gives it a kangaroo rat-like look, although its tail shows that it is not a kangaroo rat because it is not bushy at the tip. The pelage of this creature is short, and with somewhat dense, coarse hair. The color of the pelage has a few variations, but a broad dorsal stripe is always present. This broad dorsal stripe is of a darker brown color, with black tips, giving it a somewhat a grayish appearance. The sides are usually a lighter color, usually bright yellow to orange, and the under body is usually white, matching the color of its feet. These mice have eight mammary glands, four inguinal, two pectoral, and two abdominal. The male genitalia are inconspicuous except during mating season when the scrotal sac becomes enlarged and more visible. The tail (which again makes up most of this creature's body length) is bicolored, showing a darker color from above and a lighter color below. It is lightly covered with hair, which gets longer as it approaches the tip, but does not get bushy like the kangaroo rat. Its ears are very noticeable, and its whiskers are prominent. The head is small, and narrow, and it is considered to be relatively high crowned. The nose is short, yet it is pointy, and the eyes are relatively big. These mice also have a large infraorbital foramen. With the exception of the Aye-Aye, the meadow jumping mouse is the only mammal to have eighteen teeth with a dental formula of: 1/1, 0/0, 1/0, and 3/3. The upper jaw is short, and narrow. The incisors are longitudinally grooved, and its cheek teeth are small. Preceding the molars is a small peg-like premolar. As a whole the female jumping mouse is slightly larger, and heavier than the male, but their weight varies quite a bit depending on the season. Their weight during summer seasons can range from 11.15 grams to 24. 8 grams, with an average at about 16 to 19 grams. Just prior to hibernation, jumping mice can obtain a weight of 35 grams or larger.

Biological statistics (adult)
Length	180–240 mm (7.1–9.4 in)
Tail	108–165 mm (4.3–6.5 in)
Hind foot	28–35 mm (1.1–1.4 in)
Ear	12–19 mm (0.47–0.75 in)
Weight	11.5–24.8 g (0.41–0.87 oz) up to 35 g (1.2 oz) or larger before hibernation

== Habitat ==
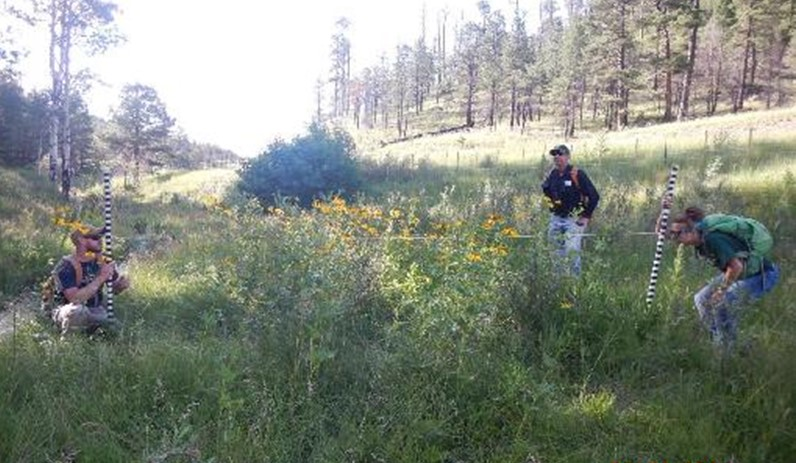
A United States Forest Service team assessing a potential habitat in Apache-Sitgreaves National Forest for the New Mexico jumping mouse

Meadow jumping mice prefer a habitat which is high in humidity. Although they may live in many different areas usually with high herbaceous cover, they prefer moist grasslands, and avoid heavily wooded areas. High numbers are usually found in grassy fields, and thick vegetated areas with streams, ponds, or marshes nearby. They prefer large open areas to thickly wooded areas. As was stated before they are found in large parts of the United States, and up to Canada.

== Behavior ==
The most interesting characteristic of the meadow jumping mouse is its saltatorial powers. Quimby states that there is large disagreement, dating back to 1899, as to how high the jumping mouse can actually jump. In 1899 Preble documented that the meadow jumping mouse can jump six to eight feet when disturbed, and in some instances it may be able to jump further. Then in 1909 Seton stated that it can creep through the grass without hopping, and then suddenly can leap out a distance of ten to twelve feet. Later in 1926 Bailey says that there are no standards as to how long or far Z. hudsonius can leap. He states that it is capable of long leaps, short hops, and also it can creep through the grass on all fours without having to leap at all and without any difficulty at all. Finally in 1935, Townsend was able to witness a leap of two feet, and many more studies afterwards and to the date have concluded that the meadow jumping mouse is capable of jumping anywhere from two to three feet depending on the situation. Under certain lab-controlled conditions, the jumping mouse has been measured to jump a few inches longer than three feet. What is clear is that the meadow jumping mouse is capable of leaping a good sized distance compared to its body size. The initial leap of the jumping mouse when startled from a squatting position is long; the following hops are shorter but much more rapid. When not alarmed the normal locomotion method is little hops of one to six inches.

The meadow jumping mouse is a decent swimmer, it usually will jump in when retreating from danger, or it was noticed as well to jump in when being set free. Its method of aquatic locomotion is very similar to its locomotion on land. At first it pushes off with long thrusts using only its hind feet simultaneously, mimicking its long jumps on land. Afterwards, the jumping is followed by movement of all four limbs, in an almost doggy-paddle-like form, with its head held high above the water. The meadow jumping mouse is also capable of diving, and a maximum distance of four feet was recorded.

The jumping mouse is an excellent digger; it usually burrows in a depression, and begins to dig horizontally with its front limbs, once inside it also uses its powerful hind feet to throw out the loose soil. The meadow jumping mouse is primarily nocturnal, but has been captured in the late evening of a cloudy moist day. This could be because they are coming out to feed a bit earlier because of the conditions, but for the most part all activities occur during the night. The jumping mouse is a docile creature when handled; amongst its kind it is also pretty calm. There is very little territorial strife amongst them, but by no means are they social creatures. They are solitary animals, rarely if ever seen in pairs, but to contrast that, they are not aggressive towards each other either.

== Diet ==
The food preference of the meadow jumping mouse consists of seeds, but they also eat berries, fruit and insects. Usually right after emerging from hibernation they will eat the larvae of insects such as butterflies, and beetles of the family Carabidae, and Curculionidae. Later they will feed on seeds, and endogone which is a fungus. Towards the beginning of fall they start to gain weight in order to get ready for hibernation. Usually two weeks before hibernation is when they began to store up enough fat, and the greatest weight gain is noticed. Overall the meadow jumping mouse is considered to be a granivore, but can also be classified as an herbivore.

In 1947 a study was done to see what the jumping mouse preferred for food. For this study many caged jumping mice were fed forty species of plants representing 20 different families. They were also fed many different fruits, such as apples, pears, and also given grains such as oatmeal. To test if they would eat anything they were given, they were also fed prepared rat and mouse concentrate. Twenty-eight species of insects, pertaining to ten different orders were collected and fed to the jumping mouse. All were partially or completely eaten except for lady bugs, carrion beetles, and one of the larvae Lepidoptera. It is not easy to say which member of a given area prefers which insect but as a whole insects do compose an important part of the jumping mouse's diet. By the time the study was concluded they could not say that any particular mouse from any given area preferred one type of food over another. However, when the meadow jumping mice were fed plants, they consumed only the seeds of some and the roots of others, but the plant itself usually stayed intact.

== Hibernation and reproduction ==
Hibernation begins around late September and early October. At the moment of entering hibernation there is a decrease in metabolism. Hibernation lasts until about mid April to May, with males emerging slightly earlier than females. From the time that the meadow jumping mouse goes into hibernation to the time it comes out there is a significant amount of weight loss. When the male emerges from hibernation it starts feeding and is immediately reproductively active. Once the female emerges, which is only a short time after the males, they begin mating, and only about two weeks after emergence all the females are pregnant and gestation begins. Gestation lasts about eighteen days, although this can be a bit longer if the female is still nursing her previous litter. The average litter size is said to be 5.3 young, but can range anywhere from two to nine young. The jumping mouse is capable of having two to three litters per year, with most litters weaned between June and August. Studies have shown that on average the jumping mouse has a litter during late spring after emergence and then again in later summer, with very little reproductive activity in mid summer.

== Young ==
The newborn young are small, naked, blind, deaf and have no claws. The only thing that these tiny newborns weighing 0.8 grams are able to do is make sounds. After only one week their body begins to get covered with fur and their claws start growing in. Their ear pinnae start to unfold and their hearing begins to develop. Between the first and second week they begin to crawl, and by the third week they are able to hop, and more importantly their hearing has completely developed. Approaching the fourth week their incisors are growing in and by the end of the fourth week they have their adult pelage, and wide open functional eyes. They are weaned and fully independent within twenty-eight to thirty-three days.

== Predators ==
The meadow jumping mouse has many predators including owls, foxes, hawks, and weasels. There are also other predators which have been spotted having meadow jumping mice either in their stomachs, or in their mouths. Examples of such creatures are common house cats, a northern pike, rattlesnakes, and a green frog (Lithobates clamitans).

== Conservation status ==
As a species, the meadow jumping mouse is currently not threatened, and is very widespread and common throughout its range. Thus, it is listed as a species of least concern on the IUCN Red List. However, three recognized subspecies are considered threatened by habitat destruction and overgrazing. As of July 2014, the New Mexico meadow jumping mouse, subspecies Zapus hudsonius luteus, is federally listed in the United States as endangered. The Preble's meadow jumping mouse is federally listed in the United States as threatened.

== Taxonomy ==
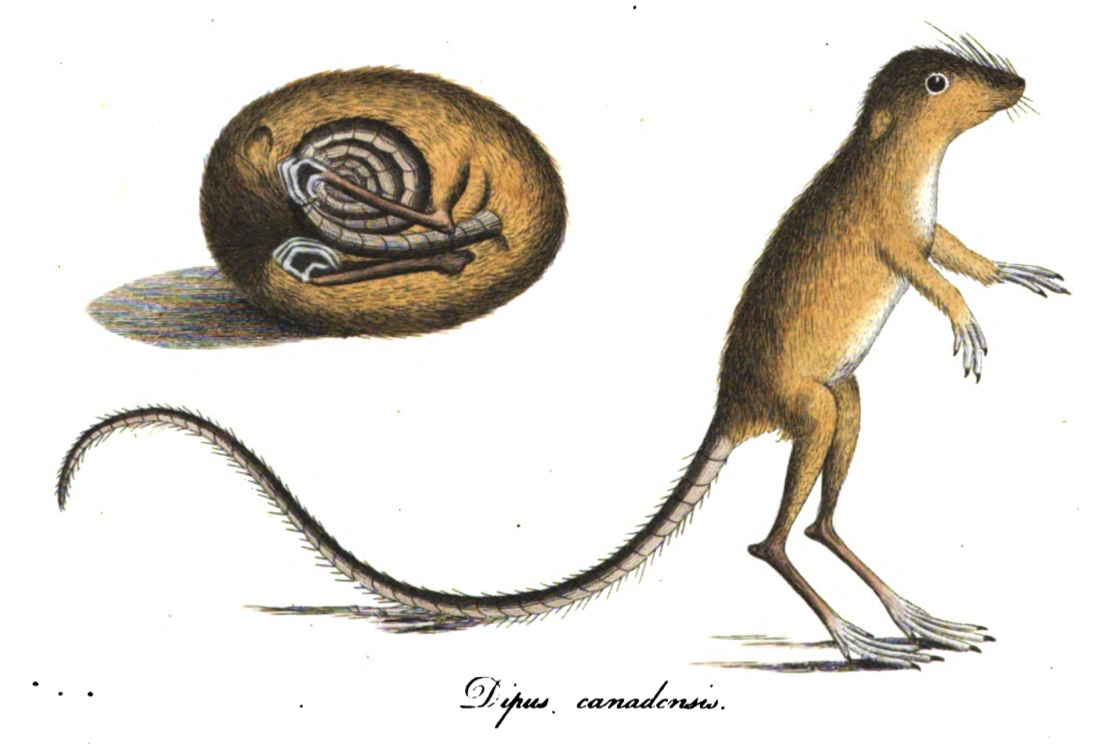
A Jumping Mouse of Canada (1797), by Thomas Davies

A jumping mouse found near Quebec in 1787, characterized as Dipus canadensis, was described and illustrated by Major-General Thomas Davies in 1797 to the Linnean Society of London.

In 1833, Constantine S. Rafinesque described the shrew species Sorex dichrurus based on a specimen he found in a proprietary museum near Niagara Falls on the New York/Ontario border. After this specimen was long ignored a recent examination revealed that S. dichrurus is identical with Zapus hudsonius.
