= Edward Alexander Preble =

American naturalist (1871–1957)

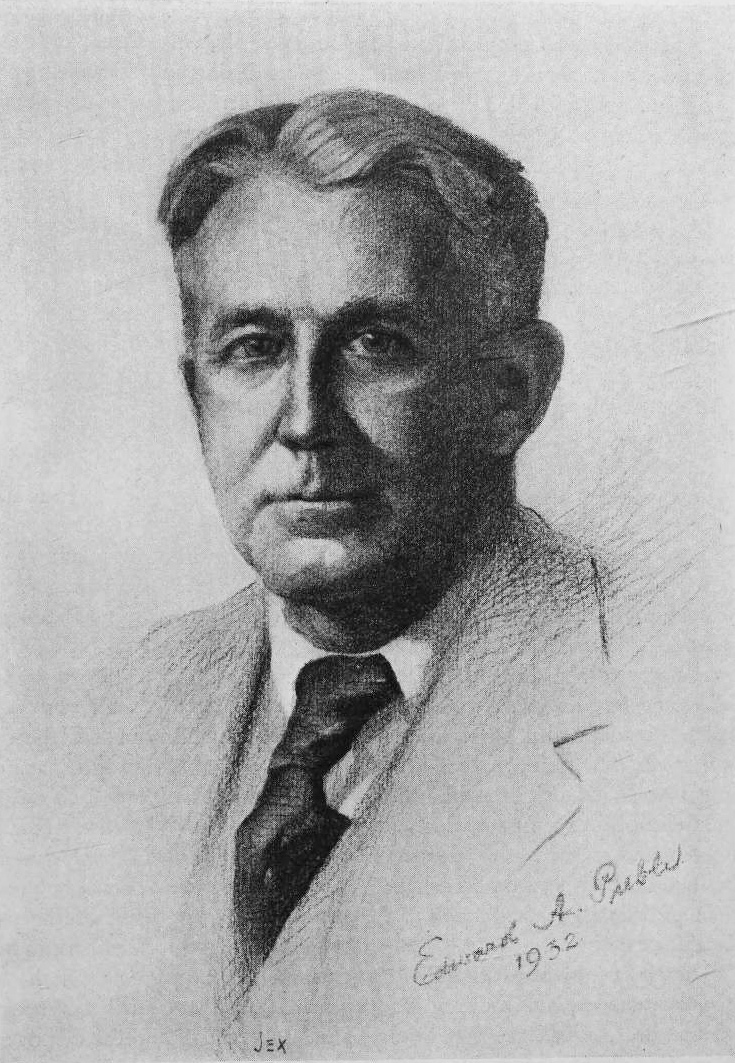
Edward A. Preble

Edward Alexander Preble (June 11, 1871 – October 4, 1957) was an American naturalist and conservationist. Born in Somerville, Massachusetts, he is noted for work in studying birds and mammals of the Pacific Northwest. He also acted as an editor for nature magazines.

In 1908, Preble published a report on the natural history of the Boreal forest of Canada. This monograph was based his two expeditions, in 1901 and again in 1903–04, with the U.S. Biological Survey. In 1914, Preble took a leave of absence from the U.S. Biological Survey to join a three member Federal Commission to document the fur seals of the Pribilof Islands. He completed his work and returned back to the U.S. Biological Survey on January, 1915. In 1923, Preble co-authored, A Biological Investigation of the Pribilof Islands (North American Fauna No. 46), published by U.S. Department of Agriculture.

In 1925, Preble became a Consulting Naturalist for Nature Magazine. When he retired from government service, in 1935, he became one of the journal's associate editors—a position he held until his death on October 4, 1957. The standard author abbreviation Preble is used to indicate this person as the author when citing a botanical name.
