= List of mammals of New Hampshire =

The list of mammals of New Hampshire includes all mammal species living in the US state of New Hampshire. Four species of mammals are currently extirpated from the state: gray wolf, cougar, wolverine, and caribou. The list does not include species found only in captivity.

While New Hampshire does not have a state mammal, it does have a state animal (the white-tailed deer) and a state wildcat (the bobcat).

== Marsupials, order Didelphimorphia ==
=== Opossums ===
Family: Didelphidae

- Virginia opossum, Didelphis virginiana
  North America's only marsupial is found in all but the northernmost parts of the state.

== Insectivores, order Eulipotyphla ==
=== Shrews ===
Family: Soricidae

- American water shrew, Sorex palustris
  Found throughout the state.
- Eastern water shrew, Sorex albibarbis
  Possibly a subspecies of the American water shrew.
- Cinereus shrew, Sorex cinereus
  Found throughout the state.
- Long-tailed shrew, Sorex dispar
  Secure and found in all but the far northern and southeastern portions of the state.
- Smoky shrew, Sorex fumeus
  Found throughout the state.
- American pygmy shrew, Sorex hoyi
  Secure and found in the northern part of the state.
- Northern short-tailed shrew, Blarina brevicauda
  Secure and found throughout the state.

=== Moles ===
Family: Talpidae

- Star-nosed mole, Condylura cristata
  Stable and secure throughout the state.
- Hairy-tailed mole, Parascalops breweri
  Stable and secure throughout the state.

== Bats, order Chiroptera ==
=== Vesper bats ===
Family: Vespertilionidae

- Big brown bat, Eptesicus fuscus
  Increasing and found throughout the state.
- Silver-haired bat, Lasionycteris noctivagans
  Stable and found throughout the state.
- Eastern red bat, Lasiurus borealis
- Hoary bat, Lasiurus cinereus
- Eastern small-footed myotis, Myotis leibii - state endangered
- Little brown bat, Myotis lucifugus - state endangered
  Endangered and in decline.
- Northern long-eared bat, Myotis septentrionalis - federally threatened and state endangered
- Indiana bat, Myotis sodalis
- Tricolored bat, Perimyotis subflavus - state endangered
- Evening bat, Nycticeius humerali Some sources fail to note the presence of this species in New Hampshire.

== Lagomorphs, order Lagomorpha ==
=== Hares and rabbits ===
Family: Leporidae

- Snowshoe hare, Lepus americanus
- Eastern cottontail, Sylvilagus floridanus - introduced
  Found in southern part of the state.
- New England cottontail, Sylvilagus transitionalis - endangered

== Rodents, order Rodentia ==
=== Beavers ===
Family: Castoridae

- North American beaver, Castor canadensis

=== Porcupines ===
Family: Erethizontidae

- North American porcupine, Erethizon dorsatum

=== Jumping mice ===
Family: Dipodidae

- Woodland jumping mouse, Napaeozapus insignis
- Meadow jumping mouse, Zapus hudsonius

=== New World rats, mice, and voles ===
Family: Cricetidae

- Southern red-backed vole, Clethrionomys gapperi
- Rock vole, Microtus chrotorrhinus
- Eastern meadow vole, Microtus pennsylvanicus
- Woodland vole, Microtus pinetorum
- Muskrat, Ondatra zibethicus
- White-footed mouse, Peromyscus leucopus
- Eastern deer mouse, Peromyscus maniculatus
- Northern bog lemming, Synaptomys borealis
- Southern bog lemming, Synaptomys cooperi

=== Old World rats, mice ===
Family: Muridae

- House mouse, Mus musculus - introduced
- Norway rat, Rattus norvegicus - introduced
- Black rat, Rattus rattus - introduced

=== Chipmunks, marmots, squirrels ===
Family: Sciuridae

- Northern flying squirrel, Glaucomys sabrinus
- Southern flying squirrel, Glaucomys volans
- Groundhog, Marmota monax
- Eastern gray squirrel, Sciurus carolinensis
- Eastern chipmunk, Tamias striatus
- American red squirrel, Tamiasciurus hudsonicus

== Carnivores, order Carnivora ==
=== Cats ===
Family: Felidae

- Canada lynx, Lynx canadensis
- Bobcat, Lynx rufus
  The New Hampshire State Wildcat is the bobcat.
- Cougar, Puma concolor - possibly extirpated
  - Eastern cougar, P. c. couguar - possibly extirpated

=== Canines ===
Family: Canidae

- Eastern Coyote, Canis latrans
- Gray wolf, Canis lupus - extirpated
- Gray fox, Urocyon cinereoargenteus
- Red fox, Vulpes vulpes

=== Bears ===
Family: Ursidae

- American black bear, Ursus americanus

=== Skunks ===
Family: Mephitidae

- Striped skunk, Mephitis mephitis

=== Weasels ===
Family: Mustelidae

- Wolverine, Gulo gulo - extirpated
- North American river otter, Lontra canadensis
- American marten, Martes americana
- American ermine, Mustela richardsonii
- Long-tailed weasel, Neogale frenata
- American mink, Neogale vison
- Fisher, Pekania pennanti

=== Raccoons ===
Family: Procyonidae

- Racoon, Procyon lotor

== Ungulates, order Artiodactyla ==
=== Deer ===
Family: Cervidae

- Moose, Alces alces
- White-tailed deer, Odocoileus virginianus
  The New Hampshire State Animal is the white-tailed deer.
- Caribou, Rangifer tarandus - extirpated

=== Whales, Dolphins, Porpoises ===
Families: Monodontidae, Physeteroidea, Ziphioidea, Delphinidae, Phocoenidae
Various whales, dolphins, and porpoises are sometimes visible off the coast of New Hampshire.

== See also ==
- List of birds of New Hampshire
- List of mammals of New England
