= List of mammals of Vermont =

This list of mammals of Vermont includes all mammal species living in the US state of Vermont. Three species, the eastern cottontail, house mouse, and Norway rat have been introduced, into the state. Four species of mammals are currently extirpated from the state: elk, gray wolf, wolverine, and caribou. Vermont does not have a designated state mammal, but does designate the Morgan horse as its state horse. The list does not include species found only in captivity.

== Didelphimorphia ==
=== Opossums ===
Family: Didelphidae

- Virginia opossum, Didelphis virginiana
  Secure and increasing throughout the state.

== Eulipotyphla ==
=== Shrews ===
Family: Soricidae

- Eastern water shrew, Sorex albibarbis
  Possibly a subspecies of the American water shrew
- Cinereus shrew, Sorex cinereus
- Long-tailed shrew, Sorex dispar
- Smoky shrew, Sorex fumeus
- American pygmy shrew, Sorex hoyi
- Northern short-tailed shrew, Blarina brevicauda

=== Moles ===
Family: Talpidae

- Star-nosed mole, Condylura cristata
- Hairy-tailed mole, Parascalops breweri

== Rodents ==
=== Beavers ===
Family: Castoridae

- North American beaver, Castor canadensis

=== Porcupines ===
Family: Erethizontidae

- North American porcupine, Erethizon dorsatum

=== Jumping mice ===
Family: Dipodidae

- Woodland jumping mouse, Napaeozapus insignis
- Meadow jumping mouse, Zapus hudsonius

=== New World rats, mice, and voles ===
Family: Cricetidae

- Southern red-backed vole, Clethrionomys gapperi
- Rock vole, Microtus chrotorrhinus
- Eastern meadow vole, Microtus pennsylvanicus
- Woodland vole, Microtus pinetorum
- Muskrat, Ondatra zibethicus
- White-footed mouse, Peromyscus leucopus
- Eastern deer mouse, Peromyscus maniculatus
- Southern bog lemming, Synaptomys cooperi

=== Old World rats, mice ===
Family: Muridae

- House mouse, Mus musculus introduced
- Norway rat, Rattus norvegicus introduced

=== Chipmunks, marmots, squirrels ===
Family: Sciuridae

- Northern flying squirrel, Glaucomys sabrinus
- Southern flying squirrel, Glaucomys volans
- Groundhog, Marmota monax
- Eastern gray squirrel, Sciurus carolinensis
- Eastern chipmunk, Tamias striatus
- American red squirrel, Tamiasciurus hudsonicus

== Lagomorpha ==
=== Hares and rabbits ===
Family: Leporidae

- Snowshoe hare, Lepus americanus
- Eastern cottontail, Sylvilagus floridanus introduced
- New England cottontail, Sylvilagus transitionalis

== Chiroptera ==
=== Vesper bats ===
Family: Vespertilionidae

- Big brown bat, Eptesicus fuscus
- Silver-haired bat, Lasionycteris noctivagans
- Eastern red bat, Lasiurus borealis
- Hoary bat, Lasiurus cinereus
- Eastern small-footed myotis, Myotis leibii
- Little brown bat, Myotis lucifugus
  Endangered and in decline.
- Northern long-eared bat, Myotis septentrionalis
- Indiana bat, Myotis sodalis
- Tricolored bat, Perimyotis subflavus

== Carnivora ==
=== Cats ===
Family: Felidae

- Canada lynx, Lynx canadensis
- Bobcat, Lynx rufus
- Cougar, Puma concolor possibly extirpated
  - Eastern cougar, P. c. couguar

=== Canines ===
Family: Canidae

- Coyote, Canis latrans
- Gray wolf, Canis lupus extirpated
- Gray fox, Urocyon cinereoargenteus
- Red fox, Vulpes vulpes

=== Bears ===
Family: Ursidae

- American black bear, Ursus americanus

=== Skunks ===
Family: Mephitidae

- Striped skunk, Mephitis mephitis

=== Weasels ===
Family: Mustelidae

- Wolverine, Gulo gulo extirpated
- North American river otter, Lontra canadensis
- American marten, Martes americana
- American ermine, Mustela richardsonii
- Long-tailed weasel, Neogale frenata
- American mink, Neogale vison
- Fisher, Pekania pennanti

=== Raccoons ===
Family: Procyonidae

- Raccoon, Procyon lotor

== Artiodactyla ==
=== Deer ===
Family: Cervidae

- Moose, Alces alces
- Elk, Cervus canadensis extirpated
- White-tailed deer, Odocoileus virginianus
- Caribou, Rangifer tarandus extirpated

== See also ==
- Mammals of New England
- List of birds of Vermont
- List of amphibians of Vermont
- List of reptiles of Vermont
- List of regional mammals lists
- List of prehistoric mammals
- Mammal classification
