= List of mammals of New England =

New England states are indicated in red

There are 7 orders, 17 families, 40 genera, and 60 species represented among the mammals of New England. If extirpated, coastal, introduced, and accidental species are included these numbers increase to 8 orders, 26 families, 67 genera, and 105 species. The region includes the U.S. states of Maine, New Hampshire, Vermont, Massachusetts, Connecticut, and Rhode Island.

The makeup and distribution of the mammals in New England are largely the result of the Last Glacial Maximum when the Laurentide Ice Sheet covered virtually the entire region. Recolonization of the area appears to have occurred from one or a few southern glacial refugia. This is in contrast to the multiple glacial refugia present throughout the American West (Stone and Cook, 2000). As a consequence of both the recent uninhabitability and the few sources of recolonization, species diversity for some taxa in parts of New England are lower than in similar areas in other parts of North America. Chipmunks and ground squirrels are exemplars of this situation. New England has one species of each, but numerous locations west of the Rocky Mountains host several species (Hall, 1981).

Habitat varies throughout the region. Maine, New Hampshire, and Vermont, in the north of the region, have a humid continental short summer climate, with cooler summers and long, cold winters. Massachusetts, Connecticut, and Rhode Island, in the south, have a humid continental long summer climate, with hot summers and cold winters. The average rainfall for most of the region is from 1,000 to 1,500 mm (40 to 60 in) a year, although the northern parts of Vermont and Maine see slightly less, from 500 to 1,000 mm (20 to 40 in). Snowfall can often exceed 2,500 mm (100 in) annually (New England Climate Initiative, 2006). Most mammals in this region exhibit specializations for dealing with the sometimes harsh winter conditions.

A comprehensive listing of all species found in the region follows.

== Marsupials ==
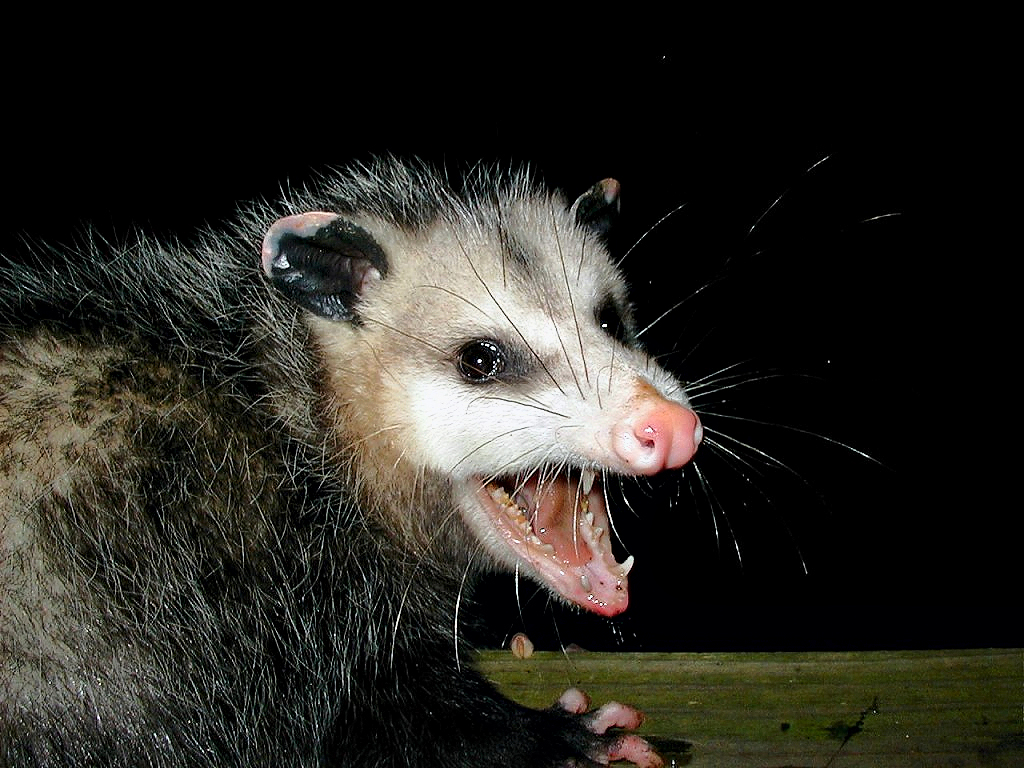
Virginia opossum

=== Opossums, family Didelphidae ===
- Virginia opossum, Didelphis virginiana
  - Distribution: southern Maine, southern Vermont, southern New Hampshire, Massachusetts, Connecticut, Rhode Island

== Insectivores, order Eulipotyphla ==
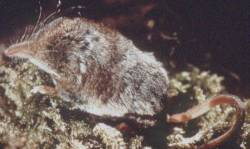
Masked shrew

=== Shrews, family Soricidae ===
- Northern short-tailed shrew, Blarina brevicauda
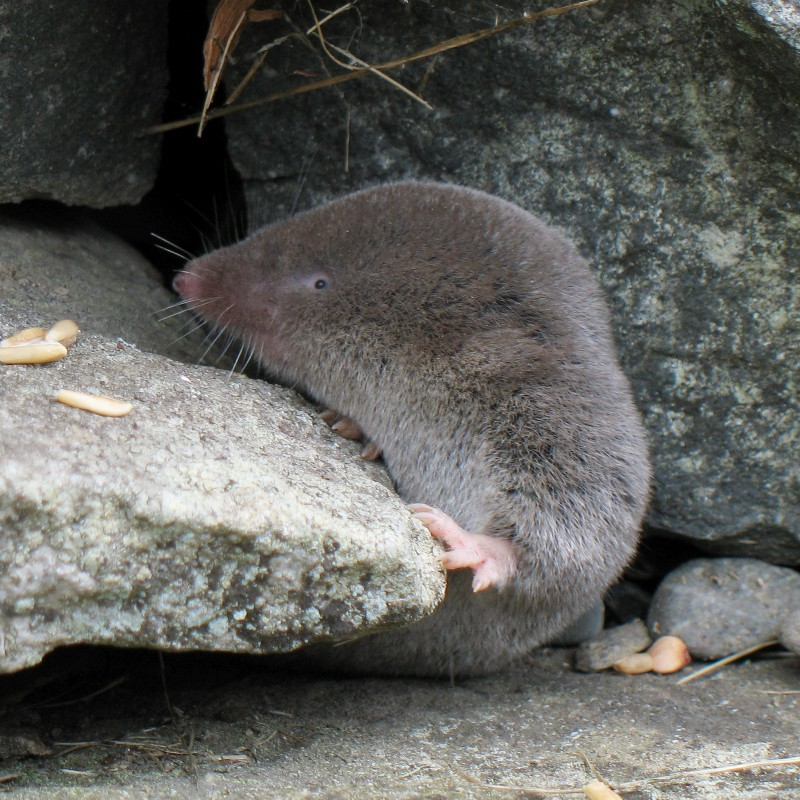
  Northern short-tailed shrew
  - Distribution: Maine, New Hampshire, Vermont, Massachusetts, Connecticut, and Rhode Island.
  - Subspecies: Blarina brevicauda angusta (northern Maine), Blarina brevicauda pallida (north-central Maine), Blarina brevicauda hooperi (northern Green Mountains, Vermont), Blarina brevicauda talpoides (southern and central Maine, New Hampshire, most of Vermont, Massachusetts, Connecticut, and Rhode Island), Blarina brevicauda compacta (Nantucket Island), and Blarina brevicauda aloga (Martha's Vineyard) according to Hall (1981). Whitaker and Hamilton (1998) argue that B. b. angusta, B. b. pallida, B. b. hooperi, and B. b. talpoides are not valid subspecies and should be synonymized with B. b. brevicauda. Hutterer (2005), however, recognizes all of these as valid subspecies.
- North American least shrew, Cryptotis parva
  - Distribution: southern Connecticut.
- Masked shrew, Sorex cinereus
  - Distribution: Maine, New Hampshire, Vermont, Massachusetts, Connecticut, and Rhode Island.
  - Subspecies: Sorex cinereus cinereus according to Hall (1981) and Whitaker and Hamilton (1998).
- Long-tailed shrew, Sorex dispar
  - Distribution: northwestern Maine, all but southeastern New Hampshire, all but northeastern Vermont, western Massachusetts, and western Connecticut.
  - Subspecies: Sorex dispar dispar according to Hall (1981) and Whitaker and Hamilton (1998).
- Smoky shrew, Sorex fumeus
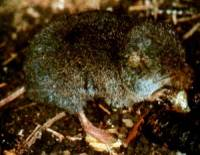
  Smoky shrew
  - Distribution: Maine, New Hampshire, Vermont, Massachusetts, Connecticut, and Rhode Island.
  - Subspecies: Sorex fumeus umbrosus (all but southernmost Maine, northernmost New Hampshire, and northern Vermont) and Sorex fumeus fumeus (southernmost Maine, central and southern New Hampshire, southern Vermont, Massachusetts, Connecticut, and Rhode Island) according to Hall (1981). Whitaker and Hamilton (1998) do not recognize S. f. umbrosus as a valid subspecies and consider all New England Sorex fumeus to be S. f. fumeus. Hutterer (2005), however, recognizes S. f. umbrosus as a valid subspecies.
- Pygmy shrew, Sorex hoyi
  - Distribution: all but the southern tip of Maine, central and northern New Hampshire, and all but southeastern Vermont, extreme western Massachusetts.
  - Subspecies: Sorex hoyi thompsoni according to Hall (1981) and Whitaker and Hamilton (1998).
- American water shrew, Sorex palustris
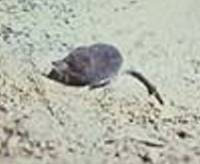
  American water shrew
  - Distribution: Maine, New Hampshire, Vermont, Massachusetts, Connecticut, and Rhode Island.
  - Subspecies: Sorex palustris gloveralleni (easternmost Maine) and Sorex palustris albibarbis (all but easternmost Maine, New Hampshire, Vermont, Massachusetts, Connecticut, Rhode Island) according to Hall (1981). Whitaker and Hamilton (1998) argue that both S. p. gloveralleni and S. p. albibarbis are not valid subspecies and all New England forms belong to the subspecies S. p. palustris. Hutterer (2005), however, treats S. p. gloveralleni and S. p. albibarbis as valid subspecies.
- Eastern water shrew, Sorex albibarbis
  - Distribution: Maine, New Hampshire, Vermont, Massachusetts, Connecticut, and Rhode Island.
  - Subspecies: S. p. albibarbis, S. p. gloveralleni, and S. p. labradorensis. It is possible that S. p. punctulatus and S. p. turneri are not valid subspecies.

=== Moles, family Talpidae ===
- Hairy-tailed mole, Parascalops breweri
  - Distribution: Maine, New Hampshire, Vermont, Massachusetts, northern and western Connecticut, and Rhode Island.
- Eastern mole, Scalopus aquaticus
  - Distribution: central and southern Massachusetts, Connecticut, and Rhode Island.
  - Subspecies: Scalopus aquaticus aquaticus according to Hall (1981) and Whitaker and Hamilton (1998).
- Star-nosed mole, Condylura cristata
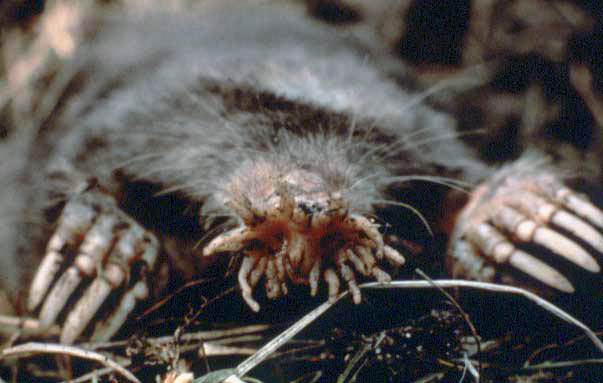
  Star-nosed mole
  - Distribution: Maine, New Hampshire, Vermont, Massachusetts, Connecticut, and Rhode Island.
  - Subspecies: Condylura cristata cristata according to Hall (1981) and Whitaker and Hamilton (1998).

== Bats, order Chiroptera ==
=== Vesper bats, family Vespertilionidae ===
- Eastern small-footed bat, Myotis leibii
  - Distribution: central Maine, central New Hampshire, central Vermont, western Massachusetts.
  - Status: endangered in New Hampshire; threatened in Vermont (Whitaker and Hamilton, 1998).
- Little brown bat, Myotis lucifugus
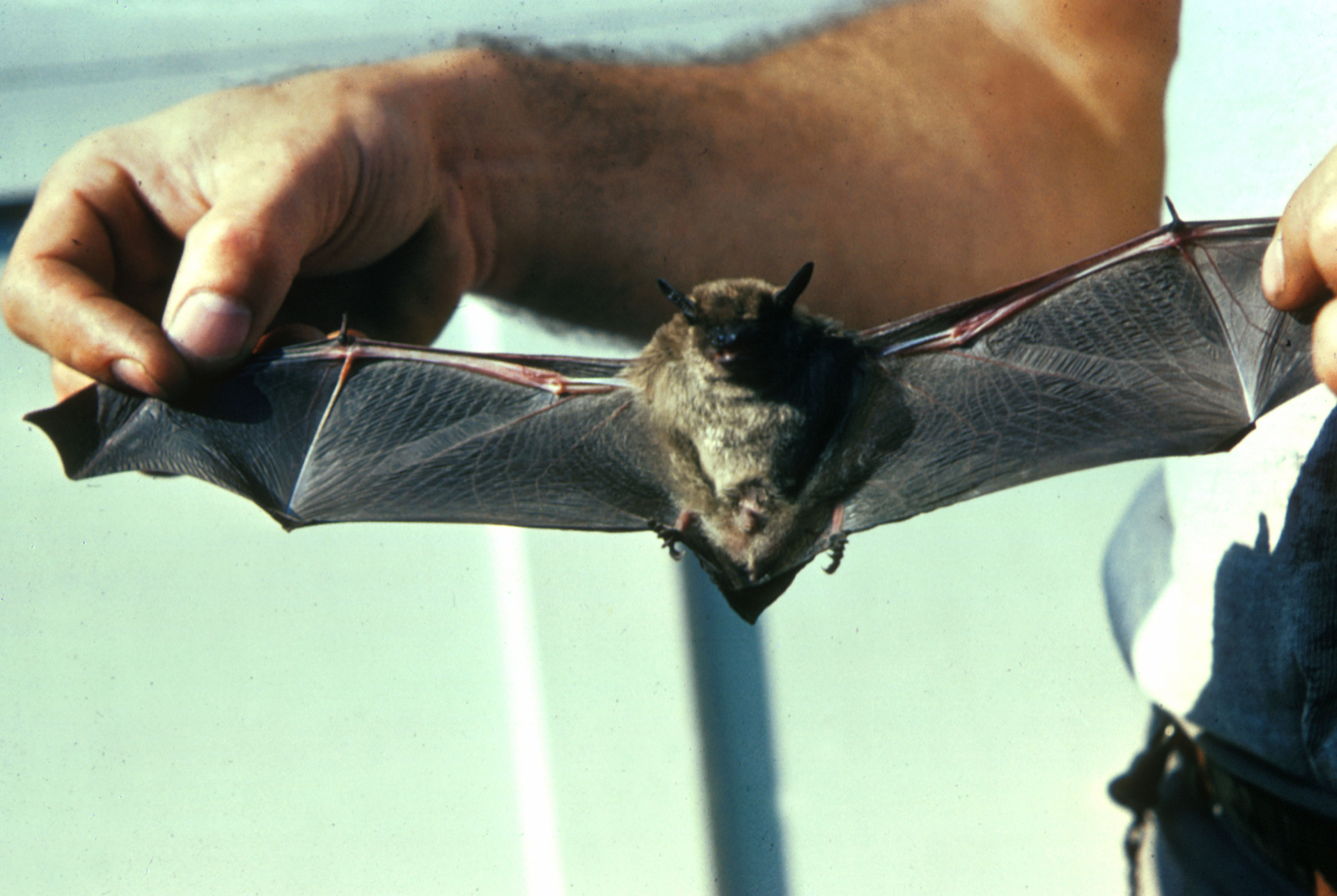
  Little brown bat
  - Distribution: Maine, New Hampshire, Vermont, Massachusetts, Connecticut, and Rhode Island.
  - Subspecies: Myotis lucifugus lucifugus according to Hall (1981) and Whitaker and Hamilton (1998).
- Northern long-eared bat, Myotis septentrionalis
  - Distribution: Maine, New Hampshire, Vermont, Massachusetts, Connecticut, and Rhode Island.
- Indiana bat, Myotis sodalis
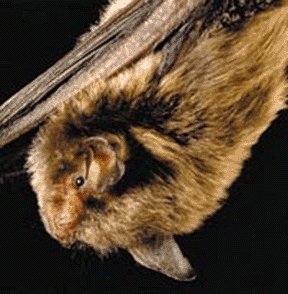
  Indiana bat
  - Distribution: southeastern and central New Hampshire, southern and central Vermont, western and central Massachusetts, all but southern Connecticut, northeastern Rhode Island.
  - Status: federally endangered (Whitaker and Hamilton, 1998).
- Silver-haired bat, Lasionycteris noctivagans
  - Distribution (summer): Maine, New Hampshire, Vermont, northern and central Massachusetts.
  - Distribution (winter): southeastern Connecticut.
- Eastern pipistrelle, Perimyotis subflavus
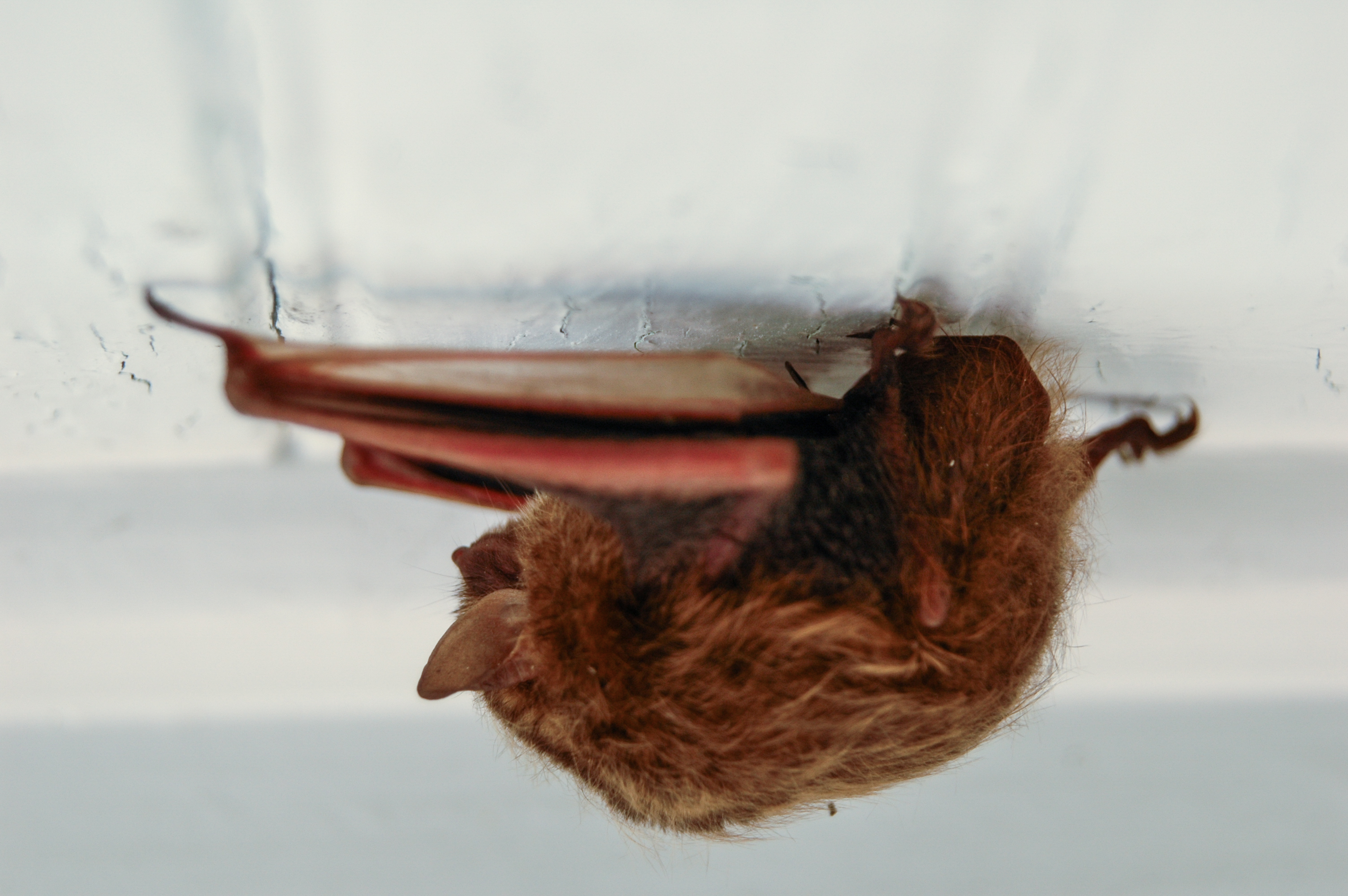
  Eastern pipistrelle
  - Distribution: southern New Hampshire, all but northeastern Vermont, Massachusetts, Connecticut, and Rhode Island.
  - Subspecies: Perimyotis subflavus subflavus according to Hall (1981) and Whitaker and Hamilton (1998).
- Big brown bat, Eptesicus fuscus
  - Distribution: Maine, New Hampshire, Vermont, Massachusetts, Connecticut, and Rhode Island.
  - Subspecies: Eptesicus fuscus fuscus according to Hall (1981) and Whitaker and Hamilton (1998).
- Eastern red bat, Lasiurus borealis
  - Distribution (summer): Maine, New Hampshire, Vermont, Massachusetts, Connecticut, and Rhode Island.
  - Subspecies: Lasiurus borealis borealis according to Hall (1981) and Whitaker and Hamilton (1998).
- Hoary bat, Lasiurus cinereus
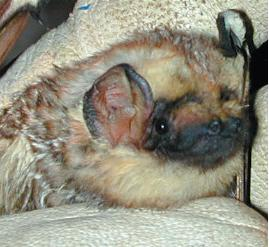
  Hoary bat
  - Distribution (summer, predominantly females): northern Maine, all but southeastern New Hampshire, Vermont, Massachusetts.
  - Subspecies: Lasiurus cinereus cinereus according to Hall (1981) and Whitaker and Hamilton (1998).

== Lagomorphs, order Lagomorpha ==
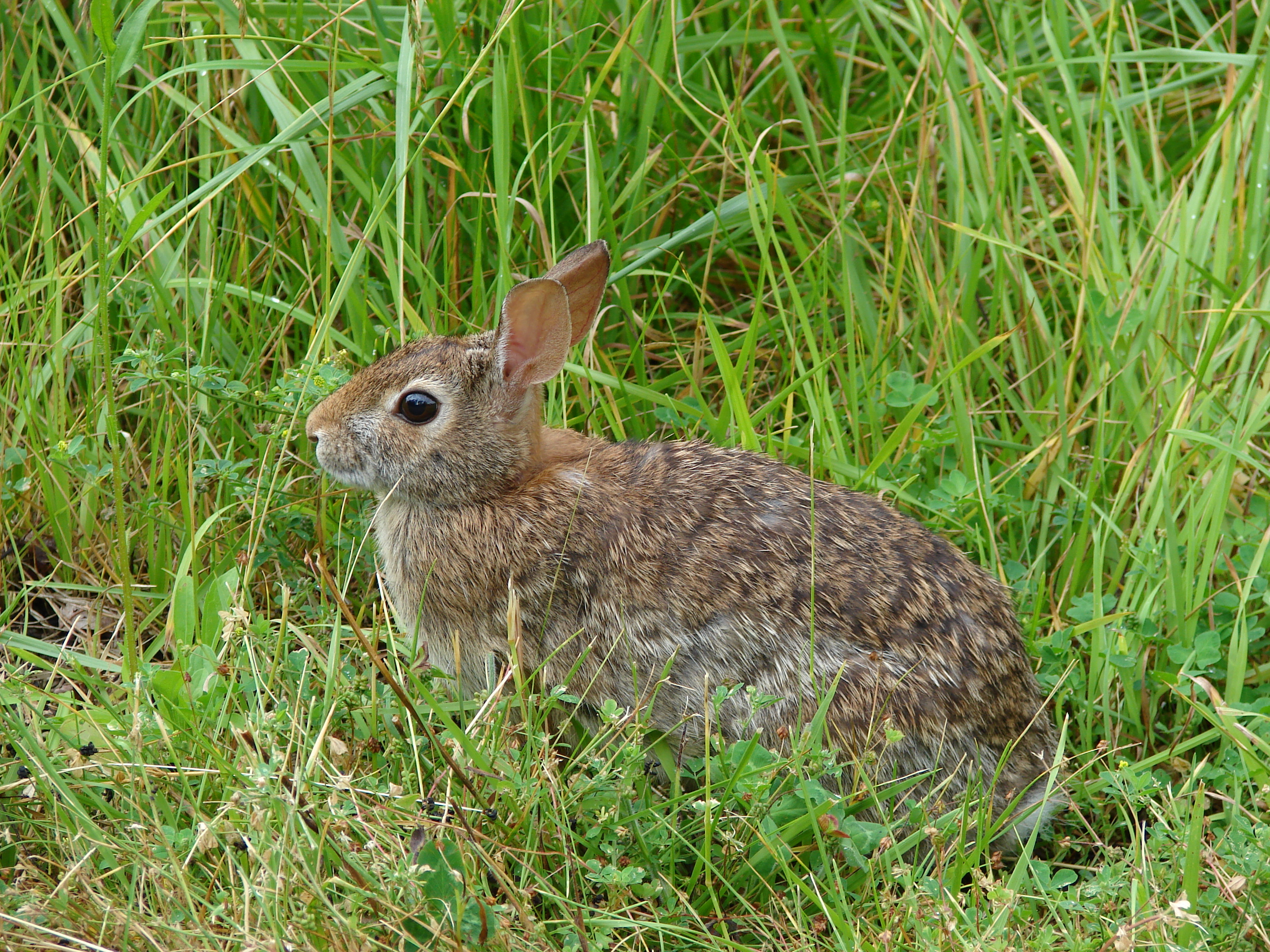
Eastern cottontail

=== Rabbits and hares, family Leporidae ===
- Snowshoe hare, Lepus americanus
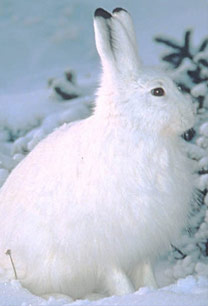
  Snowshoe hare
  - Distribution: all but the southern tip of Maine, all but the southeastern New Hampshire, Vermont, most of Massachusetts, northern Rhode Island, and Connecticut.
  - Subspecies: Lepus americanus struthopus (northern Maine) and Lepus americanus virginianus (central Maine, all but southeastern New Hampshire, Vermont, and northeastern Massachusetts) according to Hall (1981). Whitaker and Hamilton (1998) argue that both L. a. struthopus and L. a. virginianus are not valid subspecies and should be synonymized with L. a. americanus. Hoffman and Smith (2005), however, recognize both L. a. struthopus and L. a. virginianus as valid subspecies.
- Black-tailed jackrabbit, Lepus californicus (introduced)
  - Distribution: Nantucket Island, Massachusetts.
- European hare, Lepus europaeus (introduced)
  - Distribution: southwesternmost corner of Massachusetts and central and western Connecticut (persistence of population is in dispute).
- Eastern cottontail, Sylvilagus floridanus
  - Distribution: southern tip of Maine, southern New Hampshire, all but northeastern Vermont, Massachusetts, Connecticut, and Rhode Island.
  - Subspecies: Sylvilagus floridanus mallurus (southern New Hampshire, southeastern Vermont, Massachusetts, Connecticut, and Rhode Island) and Sylvilagus floridanus mearnsi (central and western Vermont) according to Hall (1981). Whitaker and Hamilton (1998) argue that both S. f. mallurus and S. f. mearnsi are not valid subspecies and should be synonymized with S. f. floridanus. Hoffman and Smith (2005), however, recognize both S. f. mallurus and S. f. mearnsi as valid subspecies.
- New England cottontail, Sylvilagus transitionalis
  - Distribution: southeast Maine, southwest and Cape Cod Massachusetts, central New Hampshire, western and eastern Connecticut, and Rhode Island.
- European rabbit, Oryctolagus cuniculus (introduced, feral)
  - Distribution: Boston Harbor Islands, Massachusetts.

== Rodents, order Rodentia ==
=== Squirrels, chipmunks, and marmots, family Sciuridae ===
- Eastern chipmunk, Tamias striatus
  - Distribution: Maine, New Hampshire, Vermont, Massachusetts, Connecticut, and Rhode Island.
  - Subspecies: Tamias striatus lysteri (Maine, New Hampshire, Vermont, most of Massachusetts, northeastern Connecticut, and northern Rhode Island) and Tamias striatus fisheri (extreme southern Massachusetts, southern and central Connecticut, southern Rhode Island) according to Hall (1981). Whitaker and Hamilton (1998) argue that both T. s. lysteri and T. s. fisheri are not valid subspecies and should be synonymized with T. s. striatus. Thorrington and Hoffman (2005), however, recognize both T. s. lysteri and T. s. fisheri as valid subspecies.
- Woodchuck, Marmota monax
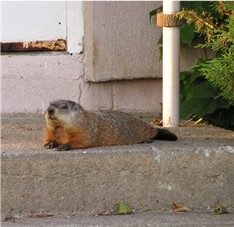
  Woodchuck
  - Distribution: Maine, New Hampshire, Vermont, Massachusetts, Connecticut, and Rhode Island.
  - Subspecies: Marmota monax canadensis (northern Maine, northern Vermont), Marmota monax rufescens (extreme western Maine, northern and southwestern New Hampshire, north central and southern Vermont, western Massachusetts, and southwestern Connecticut)), and Marmota monax preblorum (central and southern Maine, central and southeastern New Hampshire, west central Vermont, eastern Massachusetts, northwestern Connecticut, and Rhode Island) according to Hall (1981). Whitaker and Hamilton (1998) argue that M. m. canadensis and M. m. rufescens, and M. m. preblorum are not valid subspecies and should be synonymized with M. m. monax. Thorrington and Hoffman (2005), however, recognize M. m. canadensis and M. m. rufescens, but not M. m. preblorum, as valid subspecies.
- Eastern gray squirrel, Sciurus carolinensis
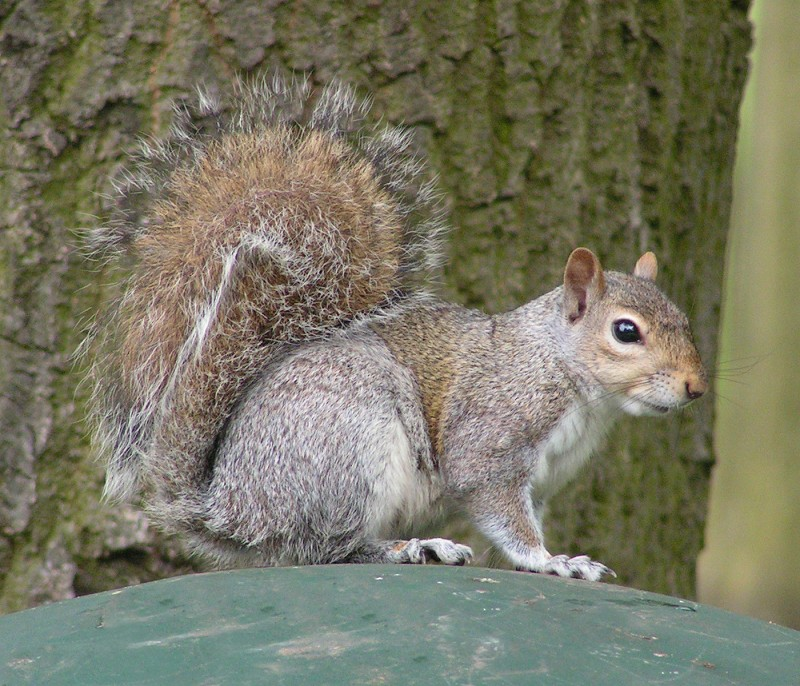
  Eastern gray squirrel
  - Distribution: central and southern Maine, New Hampshire, Vermont, Massachusetts, Connecticut, and Rhode Island.
  - Subspecies: Sciurus carolinensis pennsylvanicus according to Hall (1981) and Thorrington and Hoffman (2005). Whitaker and Hamilton (1998) do not recognize S. c. pennsylvanicus as distinct from Sciurus carolinensis.
- Fox squirrel, Sciurus niger (extirpated or vagrant?)
  - Distribution: formerly western Connecticut - may be vagrant in western Vermont and western Massachusetts.
- American red squirrel, Tamiasciurus hudsonicus
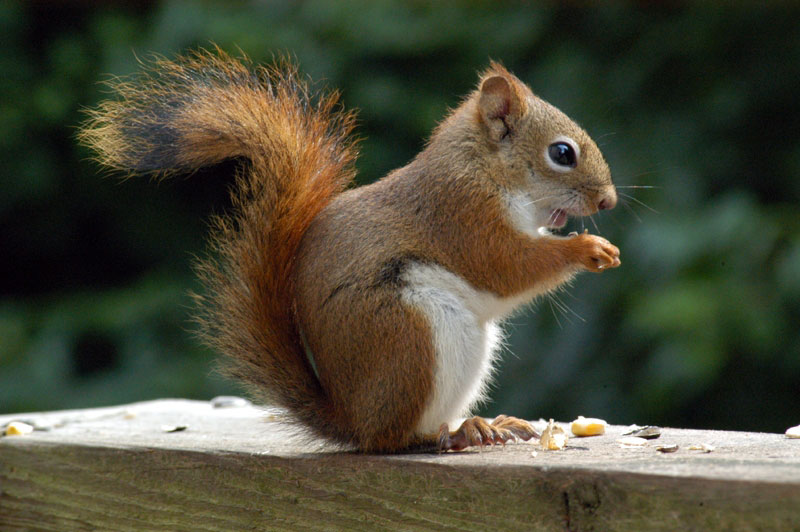
  American red squirrel
  - Distribution: Maine, New Hampshire, Vermont, Massachusetts, Connecticut, and Rhode Island.
  - Subspecies: Tamiasciurus hudsonicus gymnicus (Maine, all but southeasternmost New Hampshire, central and western Vermont) and Tamiasciurus hudsonicus loquax (western Vermont, Massachusetts, Connecticut, and Rhode Island) according to Hall (1981). Whitaker and Hamilton (1998) argue that both T. h. gymnicus and T. h. loquax are not valid subspecies and should be synonymized with T. h. hudsonicus. Thorrington and Hoffman (2005), however, recognize both T. h. gymnicus and T. h. loquax as valid subspecies.
- Northern flying squirrel, Glaucomys sabrinus
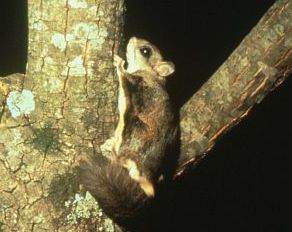
  Northern flying squirrel
  - Distribution: Maine, New Hampshire, Vermont, western and central Massachusetts, and northwestern Connecticut.
  - Subspecies: Glaucomys sabrinus macrotis according to Hall (1981) and Thorrington and Hoffman (2005). Whitaker and Hamilton (1998) do not recognize G. s. macrotis as distinct from G. s. sabrinus.
- Southern flying squirrel, Glaucomys volans
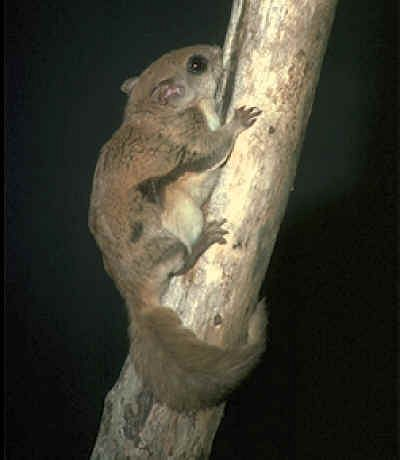
  Southern flying squirrel
  - Distribution: southern Maine, all but northernmost New Hampshire, Vermont, Massachusetts, Connecticut, and Rhode Island.
  - Subspecies: Glaucomys volans volans according to Hall (1981) and Whitaker and Hamilton (1998).

=== Beavers, family Castoridae ===
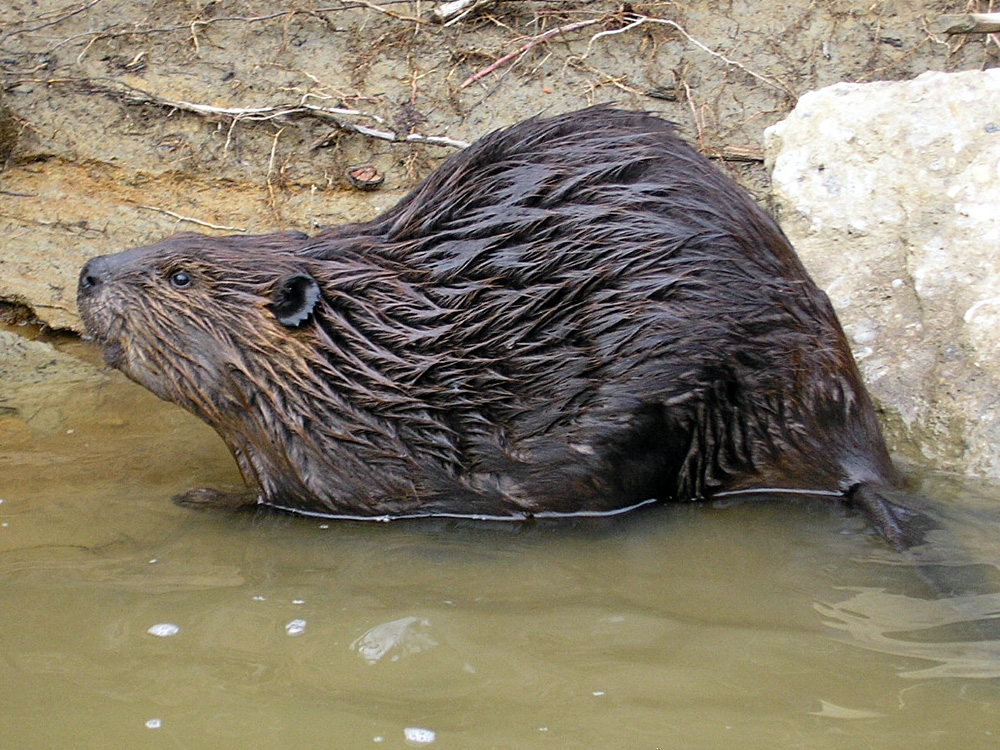
American beaver

- American beaver, Castor canadensis
  - Distribution: Maine, New Hampshire, Vermont, Massachusetts, Connecticut, and Rhode Island.
  - Subspecies: Neither Helgen (2005) nor Whitaker and Hall (1998) recognize any subspecies of Castor canadensis. Hall (1981) considers all New England forms to be Castor canadensis acadicus.

=== Jumping mice, family Dipodidae ===
- Meadow jumping mouse, Zapus hudsonius
  - Distribution: Maine, New Hampshire, Vermont, Massachusetts, Connecticut, and Rhode Island.
  - Subspecies: Zapus hudsonius acadicus (Maine, New Hampshire, Vermont, and northern and central Massachusetts) and Zapus hudsonius americanus (southern Massachusetts, Connecticut, and Rhode Island) according to Hall (1981). Whitaker and Hamilton (1998) treat all New England forms as Z. h. hudsonius.
- Woodland jumping mouse, Napaeozapus insignis
  - Distribution: Maine, all but southwestern New Hampshire, Vermont, western Massachusetts, and northwestern Connecticut.
  - Subspecies: Napaeozapus insignis insignis according to Hall (1981) and Whitaker and Hamilton (1998).

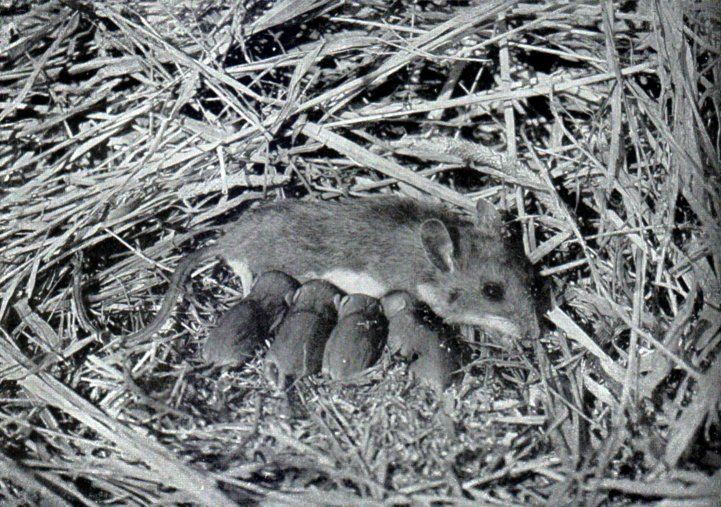
White-footed mouse

=== New World rats and mice, voles, lemmings, and muskrats, family Cricetidae ===
- White-footed mouse, Peromyscus leucopus
  - Distribution: southern and central Maine, New Hampshire, Vermont, Massachusetts, Connecticut, and Rhode Island.
  - Subspecies: Peromyscus leucopus noveboracensis (Maine, New Hampshire, Vermont, Massachusetts, Connecticut, and Rhode Island), Peromyscus leucopus ammodytes (Monomoy Island), and Peromyscus leucopus fusus (Nantucket and Martha's Vineyard) according to Hall (1981) and Whitaker and Hamilton (1998).
- Allegheny woodrat, Neotoma magister (extirpated)
  - Distribution (before extirpation): western Connecticut, and southwest Massachusetts.
- Deer mouse, Peromyscus maniculatus
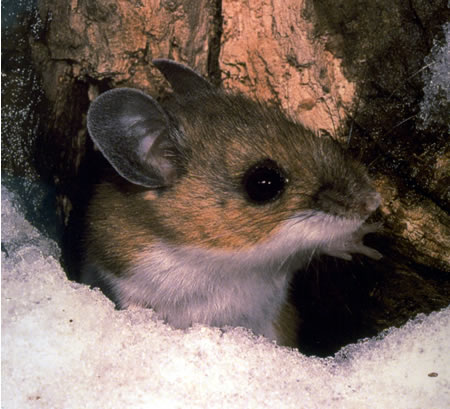
  Deer mouse
  - Distribution: Maine, New Hampshire, Vermont, Massachusetts, northern Connecticut, and northern Rhode Island.
  - Subspecies: Peromyscus maniculatus abietorum (northern Maine), Peromyscus maniculatus gracilis (southern and eastern Maine, New Hampshire, Vermont, Massachusetts, northern Connecticut, and northern Rhode Island) according to Hall (1981). Whitaker and Hamilton (1998) treat all New England forms of Peromyscus maniculatus as P. m. maniculatus.
- Southern red-backed vole, Myodes gapperi
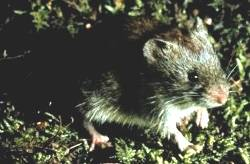
  Southern red-backed vole
  - Distribution: Maine, New Hampshire, Vermont, Massachusetts, northern Connecticut, and Rhode Island.
  - Subspecies: Myodes gapperi ochraceous (Maine, New Hampshire, Vermont, eastern Massachusetts, Rhode Island) and Myodes gapperi gapperi (northern Connecticut, western Massachusetts) according to Hall (1981). Whitaker and Hamilton (1998) treat all New England forms of Myodes gapperi as M. g. gapperi.
- Rock vole, Microtus chrotorrhinus
  - Distribution: northern Maine, northern New Hampshire, northern Vermont.
  - Subspecies: Microtus chrotorrhinus chrotorrhinus according to Hall (1981) and Whitaker and Hamilton (1998).
- Beach vole, Microtus breweri
  - Distribution: Muskeget Island, Massachusetts.
- Meadow vole, Microtus pennsylvanicus
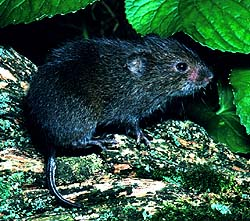
  Meadow vole
  - Distribution: Maine, New Hampshire, Vermont, Massachusetts, Connecticut, and Rhode Island.
  - Subspecies: Microtus pennsylvanicus pennsylvanicus (Maine, New Hampshire, Vermont, Massachusetts, Connecticut, and Rhode Island) Microtus pennsylvanicus shattucki (Tumble Down Dick Island and Isleboro Island, Maine) Microtus pennsylvanicus provectus (Block Island, Rhode Island) according to Hall (1981) and Whitaker and Hamilton (1998).
- Woodland vole, Microtus pinetorum
  - Distribution: southernmost Maine, southern New Hampshire, southern Vermont, Massachusetts, Connecticut, and Rhode Island.
  - Subspecies: Microtus pinetorum scalopsoides according to Hall (1981). Whitaker and Hamilton (1998) recognizes all New England Microtus pinetorum as M. p. pinetorum.
- Muskrat, Ondatra zibethicus
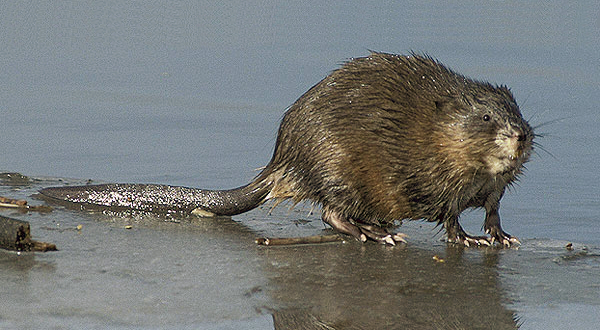
  Muskrat
  - Distribution: Maine, New Hampshire, Vermont, Massachusetts, Connecticut, and Rhode Island.
  - Subspecies: Ondatra zibethicus zibethicus according to Hall (1981) and Whitaker and Hamilton (1998).
- Northern bog lemming, Synaptomys borealis
  - Distribution: northern and eastern Maine, northern New Hampshire, and extreme northeastern Vermont.
  - Subspecies: Synaptomys borealis sphagnicola according to Hall (1981) and Whitaker and Hamilton (1998).
  - Status: threatened in Maine (Whitaker and Hamilton, 1998).
- Southern bog lemming, Synaptomys cooperi
  - Distribution: Maine, New Hampshire, Vermont, Massachusetts, Connecticut, and Rhode Island.
  - Subspecies: Synaptomys cooperi cooperi according to Hall (1981) and Whitaker and Hamilton (1998).

=== Old World rats and mice, family Muridae (introduced) ===
- Brown rat, Rattus norvegicus (introduced)
  - Distribution: Maine, New Hampshire, Vermont, Massachusetts, Connecticut, and Rhode Island.
- Black rat, Rattus rattus (introduced)
  - Distribution: extreme southern Maine, southeastern New Hampshire, eastern Massachusetts, all but northwestern Connecticut, and Rhode Island.
- House mouse, Mus musculus (introduced)
  - Distribution: Maine, New Hampshire, Vermont, Massachusetts, Connecticut, and Rhode Island.

=== Porcupines, family Erethizontidae ===
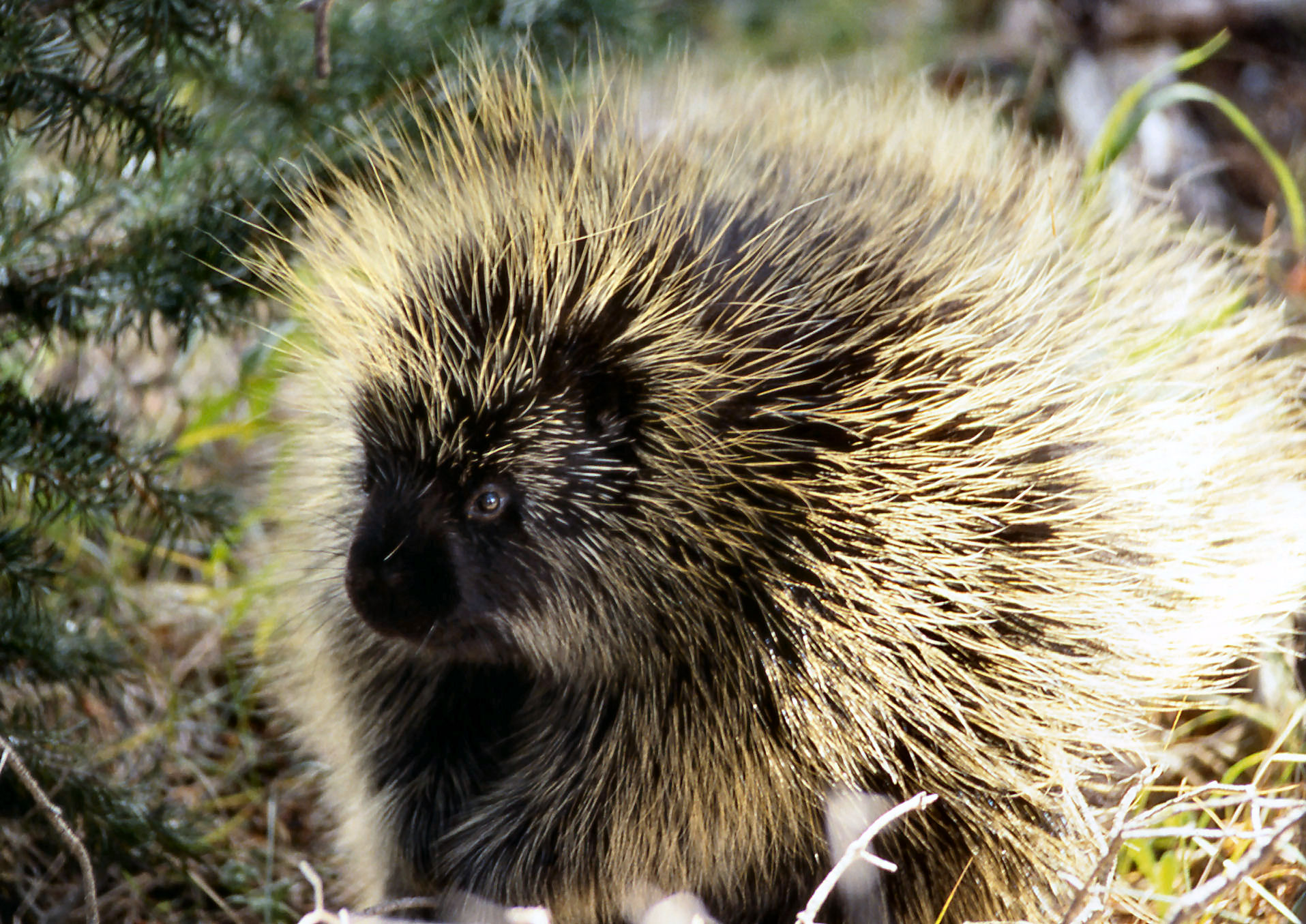
North American porcupine

- North American porcupine, Erethizon dorsatum
  - Distribution: Maine, New Hampshire, Vermont, western and central Massachusetts, and northwestern Connecticut.
  - Subspecies: Erethizon dorsatum dorsatum according to Hall (1981) and Whitaker and Hamilton (1998).

== Carnivores, order Carnivora ==
=== Dogs, family Canidae ===
- Eastern coyote, Canis latrans
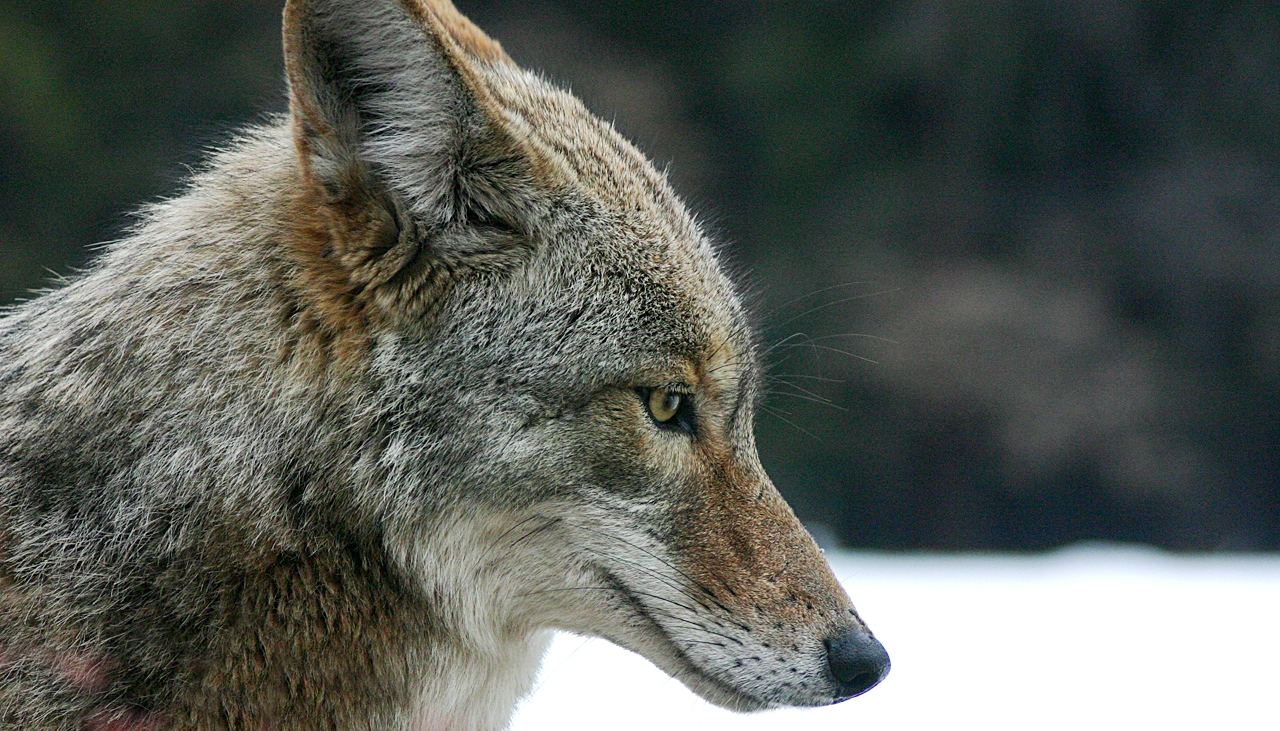
  Coyote
  - Distribution: Maine, New Hampshire, Vermont, Massachusetts, Connecticut, and Rhode Island.
  - Subspecies: Canis latrans thamnos according to Hall (1981). Wozencraft (2005) also recognizes C. l. thamnos as a valid subspecies. Whitaker and Hamilton (1998) recognize all New England Canis latrans as C. l. latrans.
- Eastern wolf, Canis lycaon (extirpated)
  - Distribution (before extirpation): Maine, New Hampshire, Vermont, Massachusetts, Connecticut, and Rhode Island.
  - Status: federally endangered (Whitaker and Hamilton, 1998).
- Gray fox, Urocyon cinereoargenteus
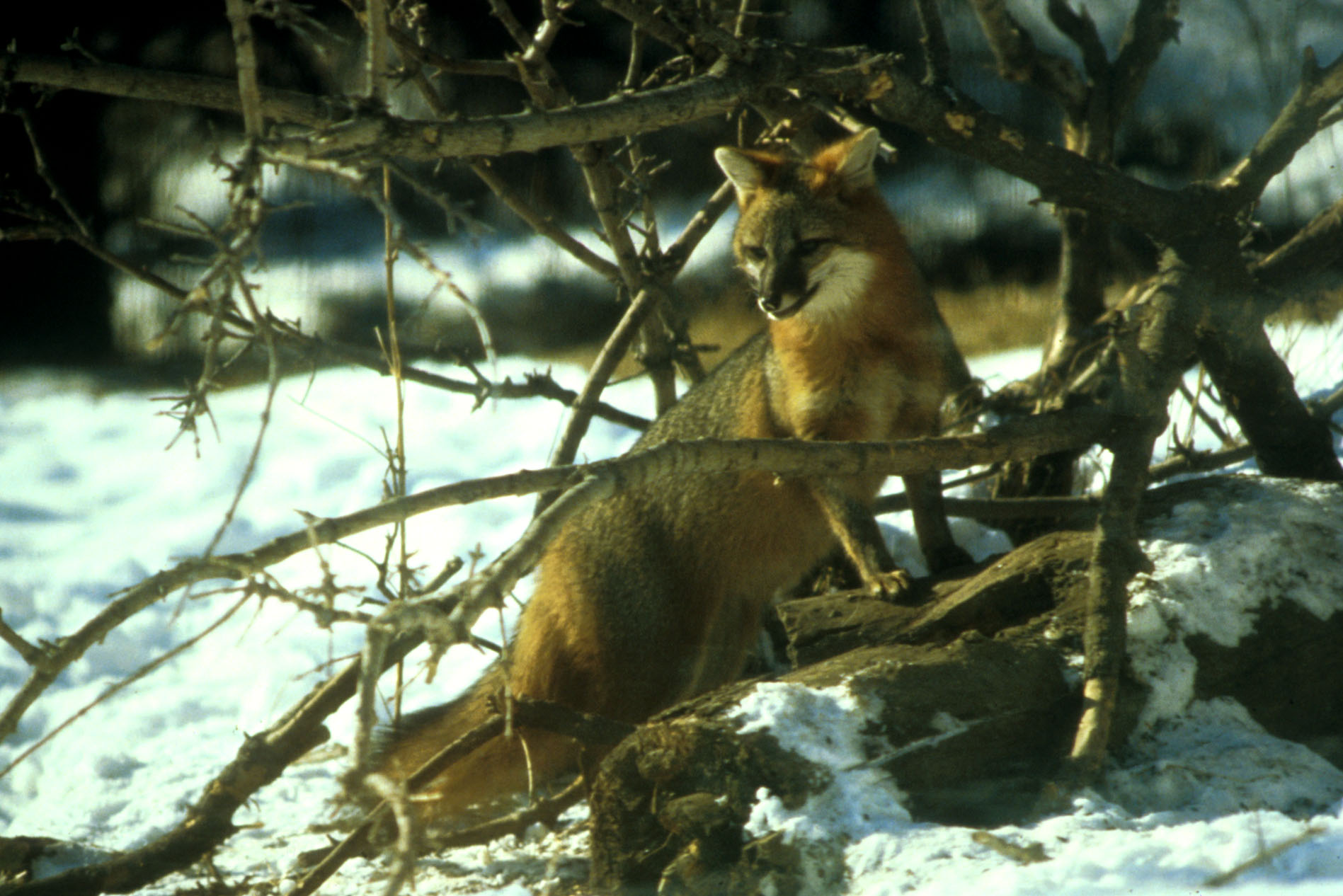
  Gray fox
  - Distribution: southern Maine, New Hampshire, Vermont, all but extreme southeastern Massachusetts, all but southeastern Connecticut, and northern Rhode Island.
  - Subspecies: Urocyon cinereoargenteus borealis (Maine, New Hampshire, Vermont, and central Massachusetts) and Urocyon cinereoargenteus cinereoargenteus (all but southeastern Connecticut, eastern Massachusetts, and northern Rhode Island) according to Hall (1981). Whitaker and Hamilton (1998) do not recognize U. c. borealis as valid and recognize all New England Urocyon cinereoargenteus as U. c. cinereoargenteus. Wozencraft (2005), however, does recognize U. c. borealis as a valid subspecies.
- Red fox, Vulpes vulpes
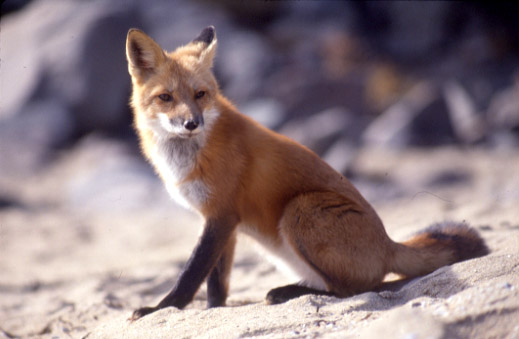
  Red fox
  - Distribution: Maine, New Hampshire, Vermont, Massachusetts, Connecticut, and Rhode Island.
  - Subspecies: Vulpes vulpes rubricosa (northern Maine) and Vulpes vulpes fulva (southern Maine, New Hampshire, Vermont, Massachusetts, Connecticut, and Rhode Island) according to Hall (1981). Whitaker and Hamilton (1998) do not recognize V. v. rubricosa as valid and recognize all New England Vulpes vulpes as V. v. fulva. Wozencraft (2005), however, does recognize V. v. rubricosa as a valid subspecies.

=== Bears, family Ursidae ===
- American black bear, Ursus americanus
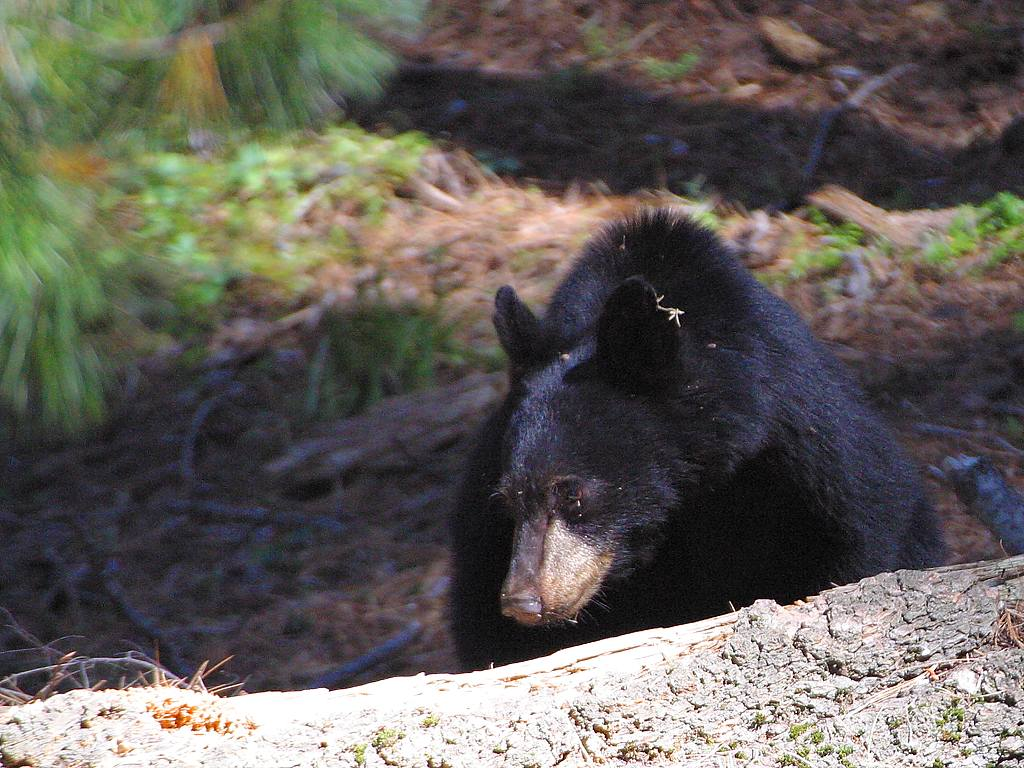
  Black bear
  - Distribution: northern and central Maine, all but southeastern New Hampshire, all but northwestern Vermont, western and central Massachusetts, and throughout Connecticut.
  - Subspecies: Ursus americanus americanus according to Hall (1981) and Whitaker and Hamilton (1998).

=== Seals, family Phocidae (coastal) ===
- Harbor seal, Phoca vitulina (coastal)
  - Subspecies: Phoca vitulina concolor according to Hall (1981) and Folkens (2002).
- Gray seal, Halichoerus grypus (coastal)
- Bearded seal, Erignathus barbatus (extremely rare coastal vagrant)
- Ringed seal, Pusa hispida (uncommon coastal vagrant)
- Harp seal, Pagophilus groenlandicus (occasional coastal vagrant)
  - Subspecies: Pagophilus groenlandicus groenlandicus according to Hall (1981) and Folkens (2002).
- Hooded seal, Cystophora cristata (uncommon coastal vagrant)

=== Walrus, family Odobenidae ===
- Walrus, Odobenus rosmarus (extremely rare coastal vagrant, no recent records)

=== Raccoons, family Procyonidae ===
- Common raccoon, Procyon lotor
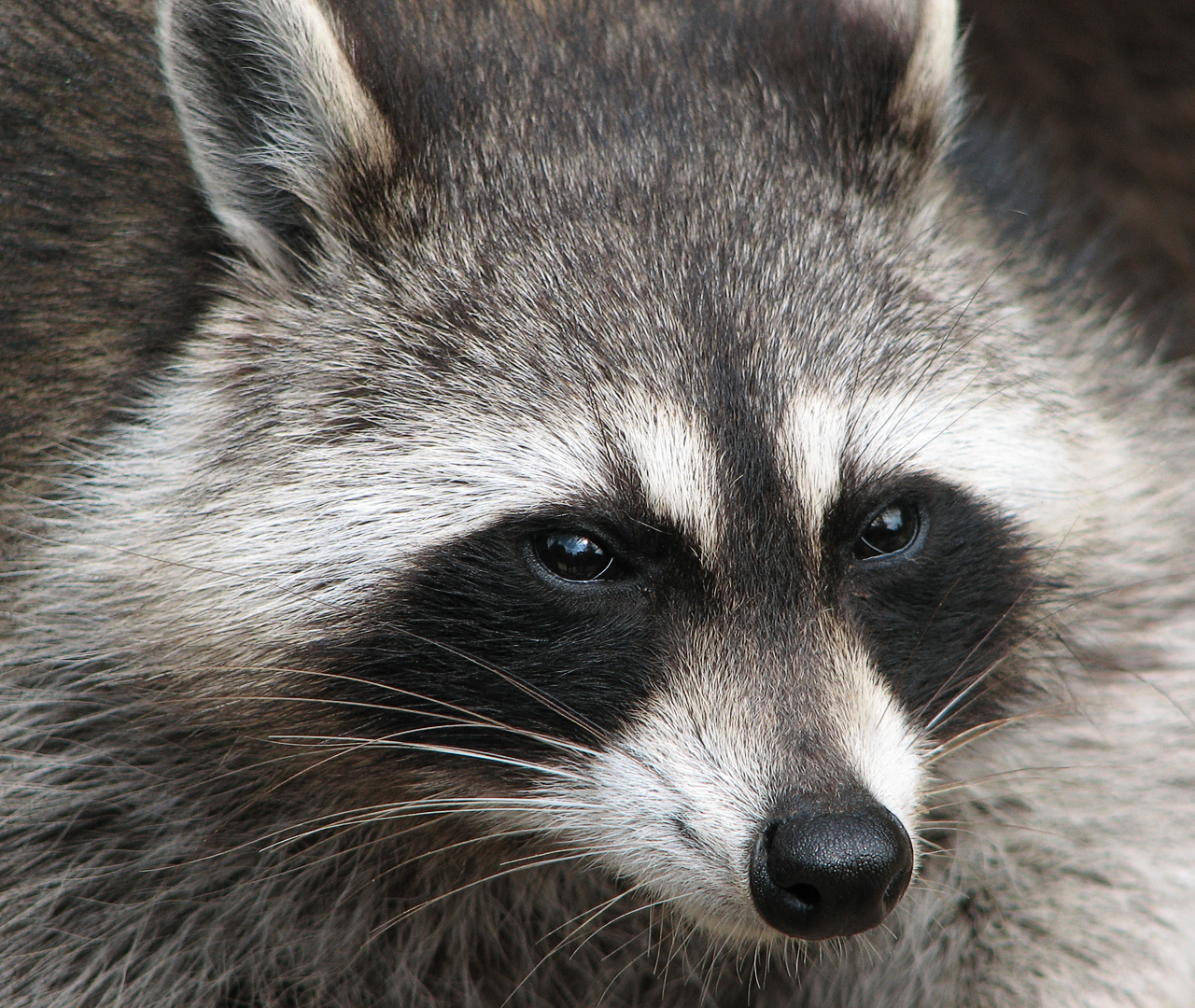
  Raccoon
  - Distribution: Maine, New Hampshire, Vermont, Massachusetts, Connecticut, and Rhode Island.
  - Subspecies: Procyon lotor lotor according to Hall (1981) and Whitaker and Hamilton (1998).

=== Weasels, minks, martens, fishers, and otters, family Mustelidae ===
- Wolverine, Gulo gulo (extirpated)
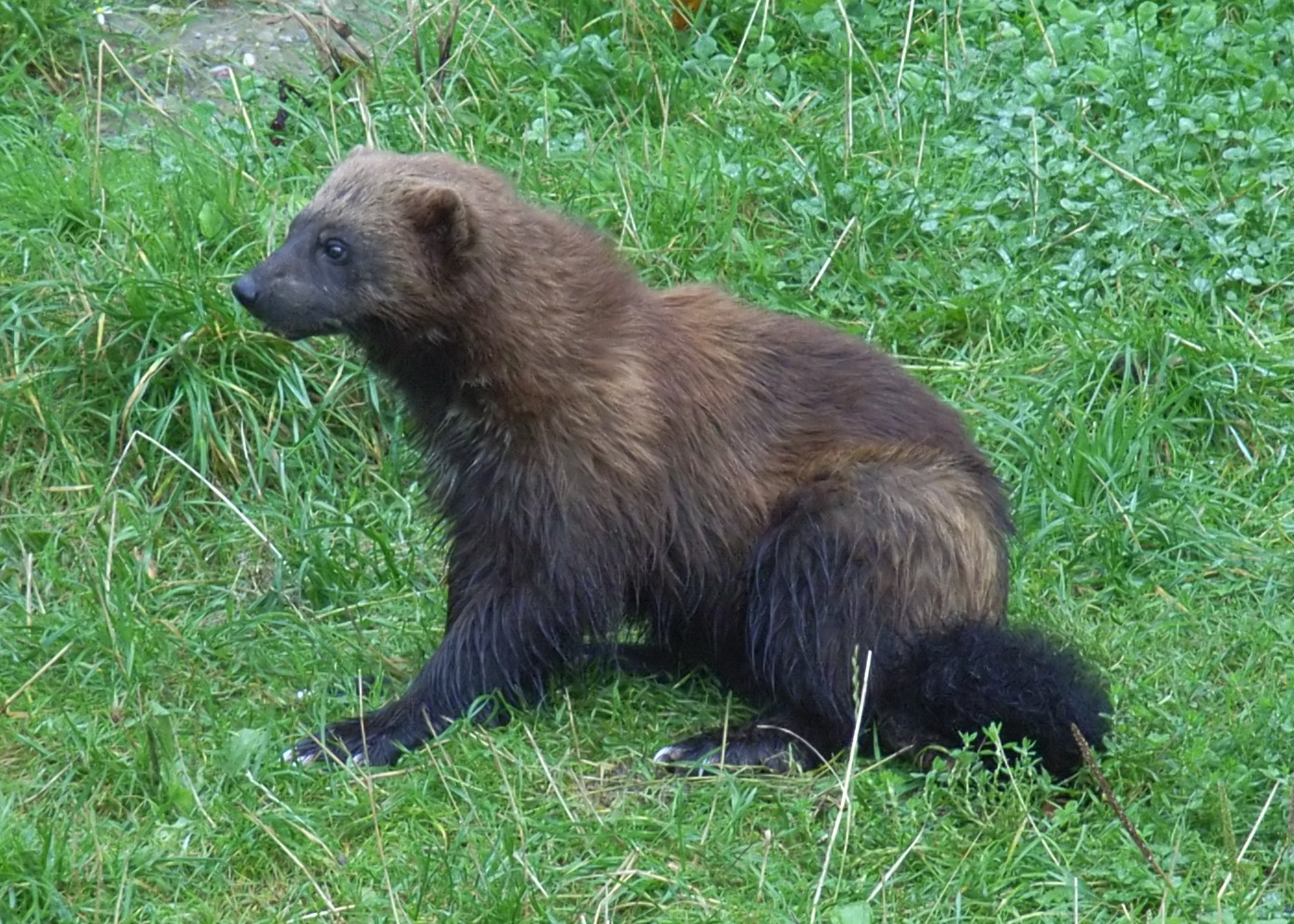
  Wolverine
  - Distribution (before extirpation): Maine, Vermont, New Hampshire, and western Massachusetts.
- Subspecies: Gulo gulo according to Hall (1981) and Whitaker and Hamilton (1998).
- River otter, Lontra canadensis
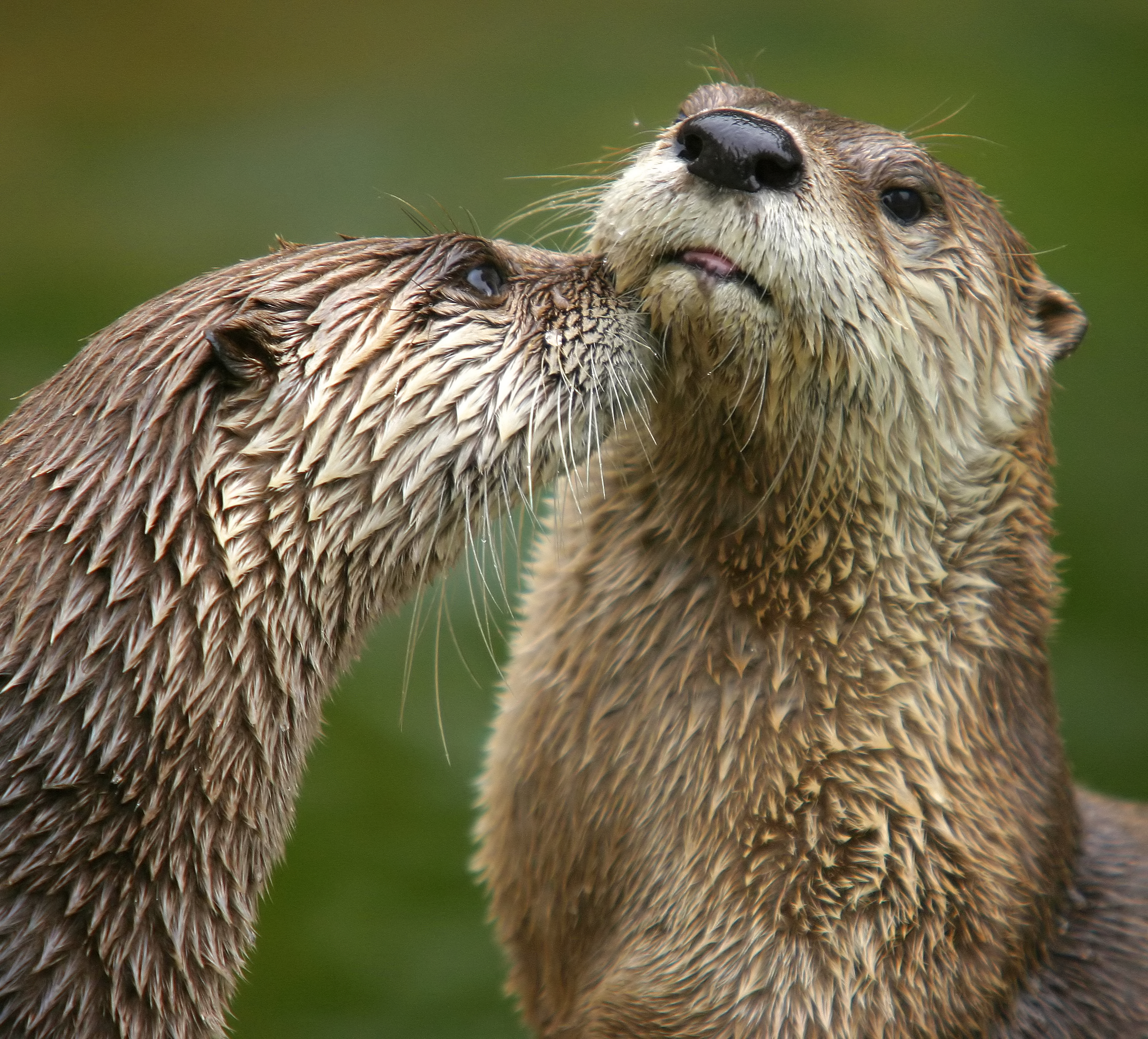
  River otters
  - Distribution: Maine, New Hampshire, Vermont, Massachusetts, northern Connecticut, and northern Rhode Island.
  - Subspecies: Lontra canadensis canadensis according to Hall (1981) and Whitaker and Hamilton (1998).
- American marten, Martes americana
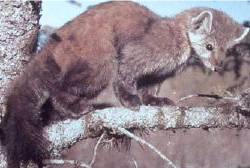
  Pine marten
  - Distribution: northern Maine, northern New Hampshire, and northeast Vermont. Originally distributed throughout Maine, most of New Hampshire, most of Vermont, central and western Massachusetts, and northern Connecticut.
  - Subspecies: Martes americana americana according to Hall (1981) and Whitaker and Hamilton (1998).
  - Status: endangered in Vermont; threatened in New Hampshire.
- American ermine, Mustela richardsonii
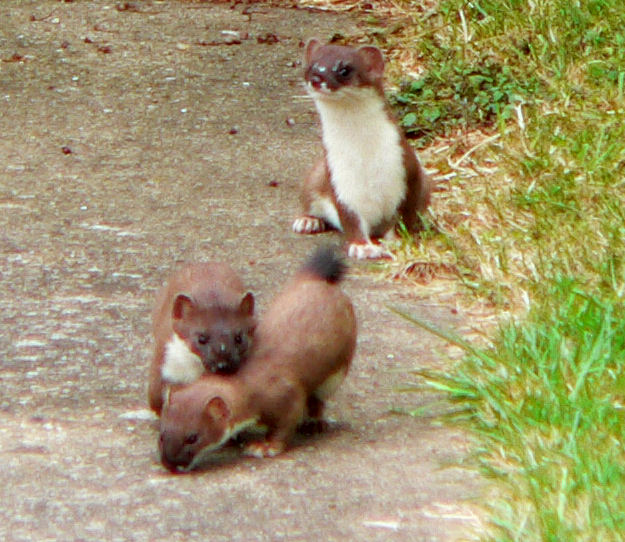
  Short-tailed weasel
  - Distribution: Maine, New Hampshire, Vermont, Massachusetts, Connecticut, and Rhode Island.
  - Subspecies: Mustela richardsonii cicognanii according to Hall (1981) and Whitaker and Hamilton (1998).
- Long-tailed weasel, Neogale frenata
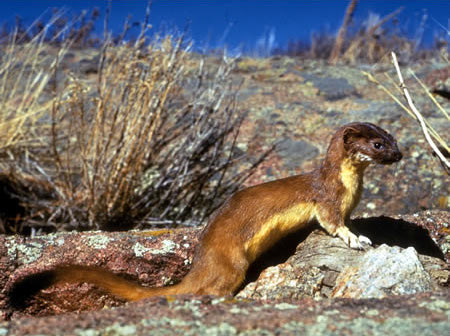
  Long-tailed weasel
  - Distribution: Maine, New Hampshire, Vermont, Massachusetts, Connecticut, and Rhode Island.
  - Subspecies: Neogale frenata occisor (all but western Maine) and Neogale frenata noveboracensis (western Maine, New Hampshire, Vermont, Massachusetts, Connecticut, and Rhode Island) according to Hall (1981). Whitaker and Hamilton (1998) do not recognize both N. f. occisor and N. f. noveboracensis as valid and recognize all New England Neogale frenata as Neogale frenata frenata. Wozencraft (2005), however, does recognize both N. f. occisor and N. f. noveboracensis as valid subspecies.
- Sea mink, Neogale macrodon (extinct)
  - Distribution (historic): coastal Massachusetts and eastern Maine
- American mink, Neogale vison
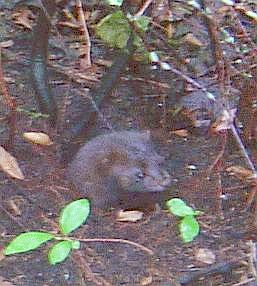
  Mink
  - Distribution: Maine, New Hampshire, Vermont, Massachusetts, Connecticut, and Rhode Island.
  - Subspecies: Neogale vison vison (Maine, all but southernmost New Hampshire, and all but southernmost Vermont) and Neogale vison mink (southernmost New Hampshire, southernmost Vermont, Massachusetts, Connecticut, and Rhode Island) according to Hall (1981). Whitaker and Hamilton (1998) do not recognize N. v. mink as valid and recognize all New England Neogale vison as N. v. vison. Wozencraft (2005), however, does recognize N. v. mink as a valid subspecies.
- Fisher, Pekania pennanti
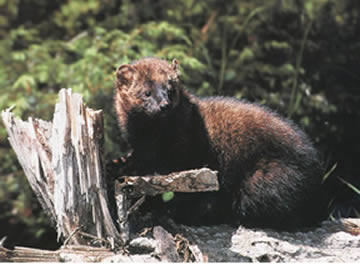
  Fisher
  - Distribution: Rhode Island, Connecticut, Maine, New Hampshire, all but southwestern Vermont, most of Massachusetts - originally distributed throughout Maine, New Hampshire, Vermont, Massachusetts and northwestern Connecticut.
  - Subspecies: Pekania pennanti pennanti according to Hall (1981) and Whitaker and Hamilton (1998).

=== Skunks, family Mephitidae ===
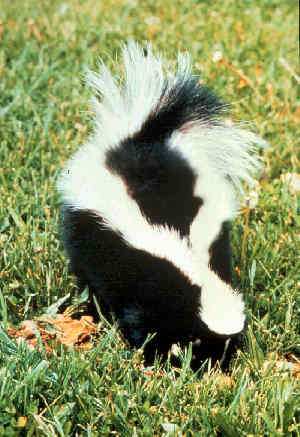
Striped skunk

- Striped skunk, Mephitis mephitis
  - Distribution: Maine, New Hampshire, Vermont, Massachusetts, Connecticut, and Rhode Island.
  - Subspecies: Mephitis mephitis nigra according to Hall (1981). Wozencraft (2005) also recognizes M. m. nigra as a valid subspecies. Whitaker and Hamilton (1998) recognize all New England Mephitis mephitis as Mephitis mephitis mephitis.

=== Family Felidae ===
- Canada lynx, Lynx canadensis
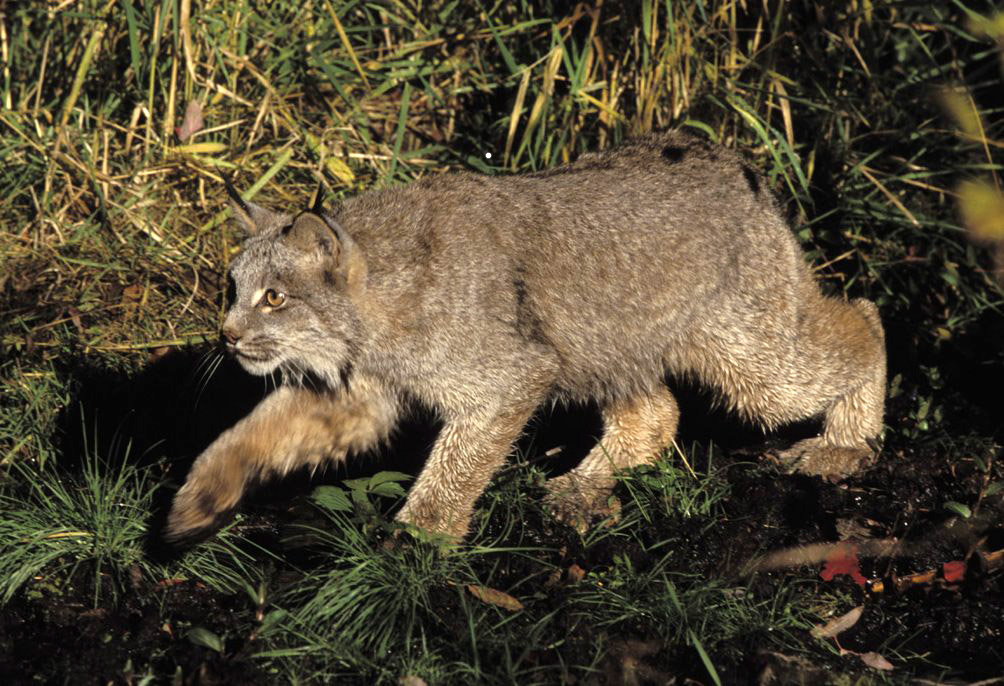
  Canada lynx
  - Distribution: northern Maine, northern New Hampshire, and northern Vermont; formerly Massachusetts - originally distributed throughout New England.
  - Status: endangered in New Hampshire and Vermont (Whitaker and Hamilton, 1998).
- Bobcat, Lynx rufus
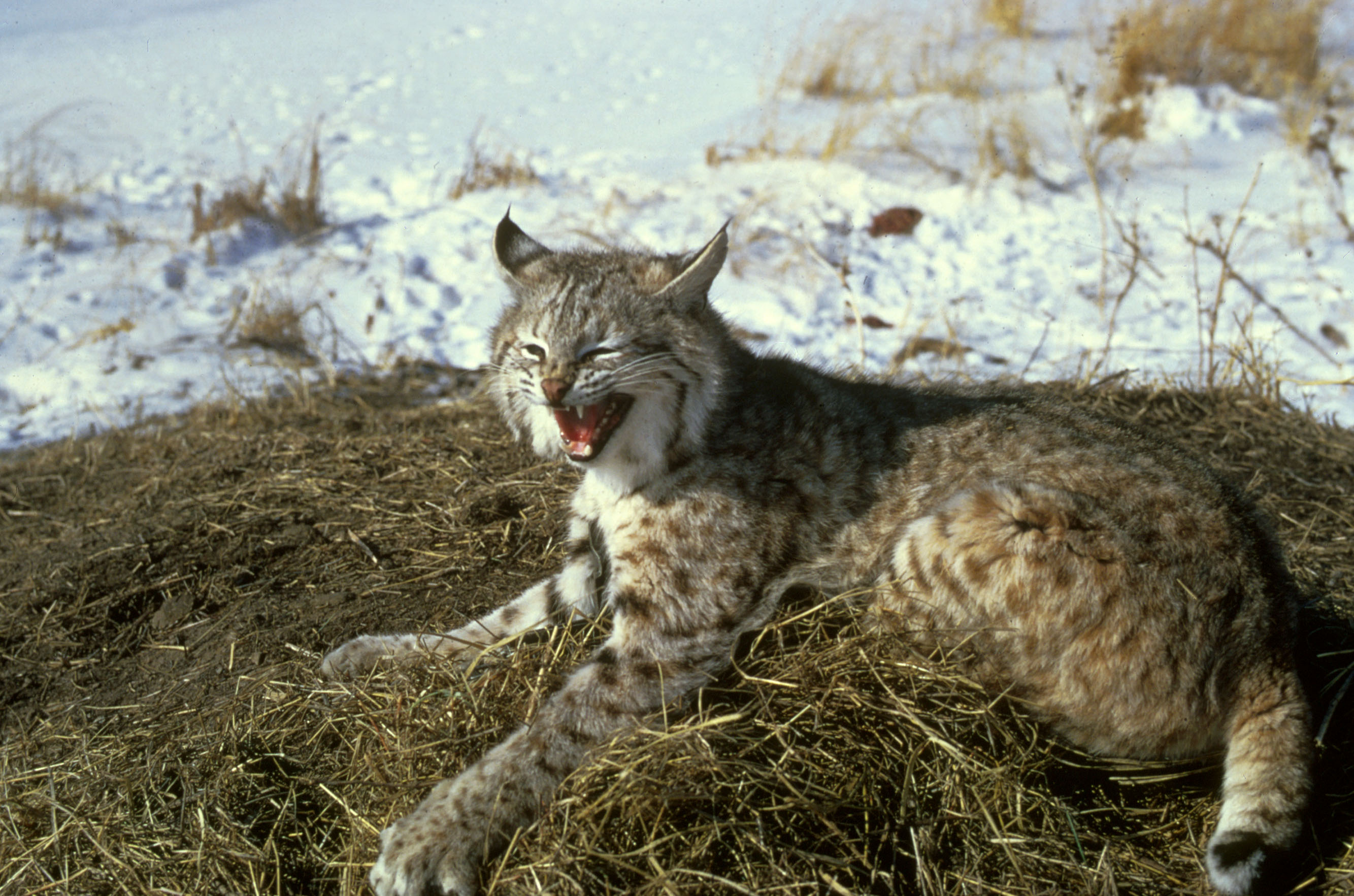
  Bobcat
  - Distribution: Maine, New Hampshire, Vermont, Connecticut and northern Massachusetts.
  - Subspecies: Lynx rufus rufus
  - Status: threatened in Rhode Island.
- Cougar, Puma concolor (extirpated)
  - Distribution (before extirpation): Maine, New Hampshire, Vermont, Massachusetts, Connecticut, and Rhode Island.
  - Subspecies (before extirpation): Puma concolor couguar according to Hall (1981) and Whitaker and Hamilton (1998).
  - Status: extirpated. Eastern cougar population is extinct.

== Even-toed ungulates and whales, order Cetartiodactyla ==
=== Deer and moose, family Cervidae ===
- Fallow deer, Dama dama (introduced)
  - Distribution: Dukes County, Massachusetts, and Rhode Island
- Eastern elk, Cervus canadensis canadensis (extirpated)
  - Distribution (before extirpation): southern Vermont, western Massachusetts, northwestern Connecticut but sometimes in Rhode Island.
  - Subspecies (before extirpation): Cervus canadensis canadensis according to Hall (1981) and Whitaker and Hamilton (1998).
- White-tailed deer, Odocoileus virginianus
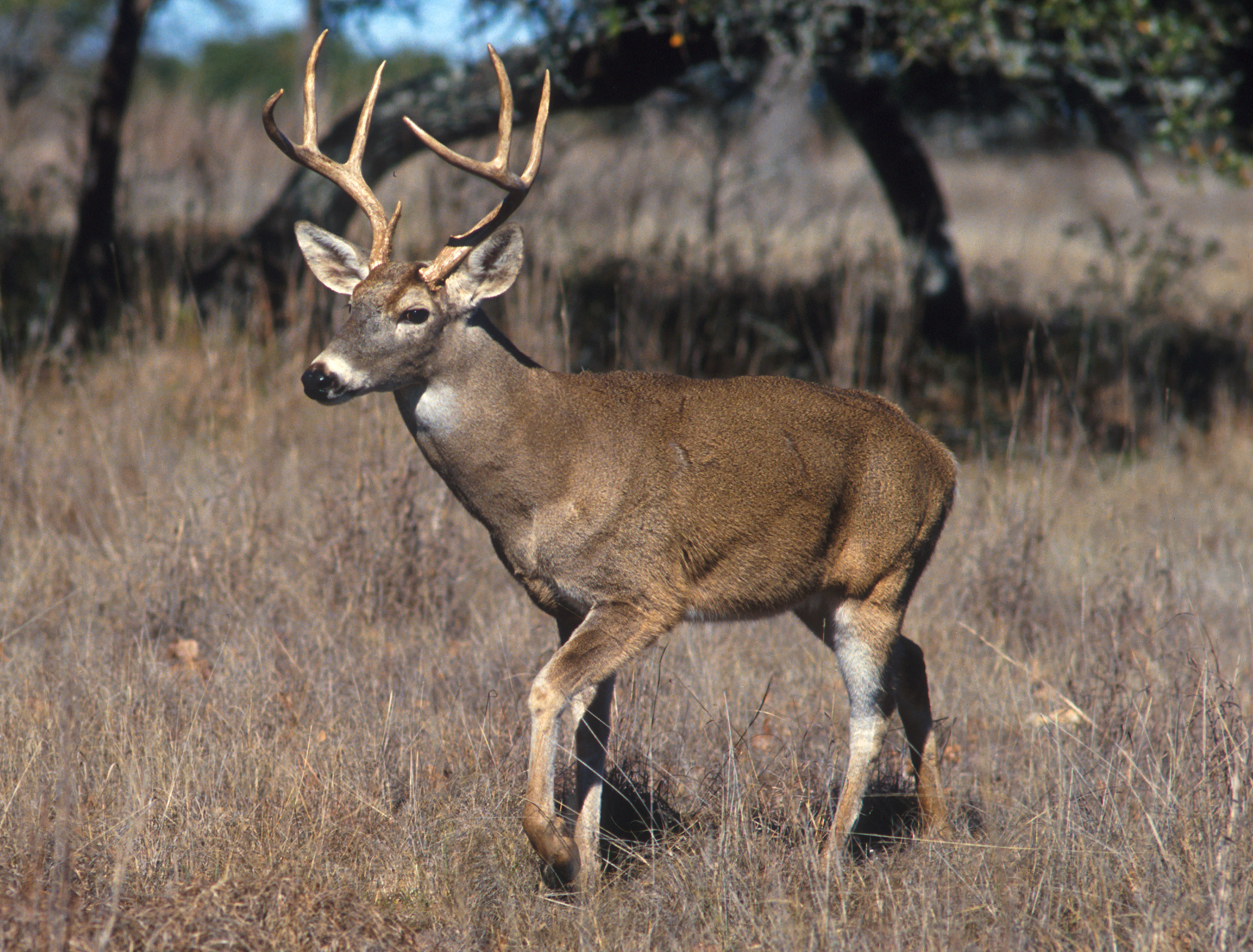
  White-tailed deer
  - Distribution: Maine, New Hampshire, Vermont, Massachusetts, Connecticut, and Rhode Island.
  - Subspecies: Odocoileus virginianus borealis according to Hall (1981). Grubb (2005) also recognizes O. v. borealis as a valid subspecies. Whitaker and Hamilton (1998) recognize all New England Odocoileus virginianus as O. v. virginianus.
- Moose, Alces alces
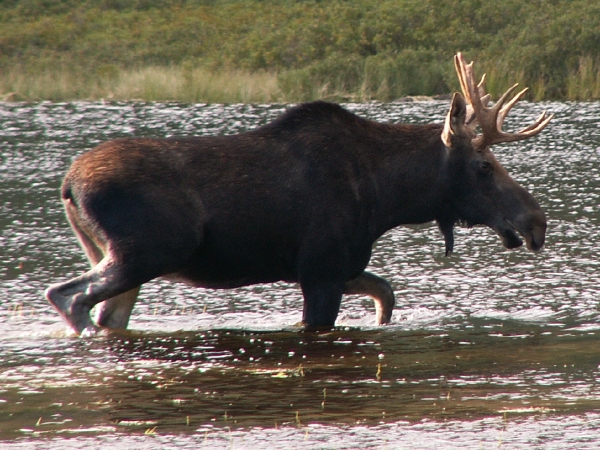
  Moose
  - Distribution: Maine, all but southeastern New Hampshire, Vermont, northwest Connecticut, northernmost Massachusetts and Rhode Island.
  - Subspecies: Alces alces americana according to Hall (1981) and Whitaker and Hamilton (1998).
- Caribou, Rangifer tarandus (extirpated)
  - Distribution (before extirpation): Maine, northern New Hampshire, northern Vermont, Massachusetts
  - Subspecies (before extirpation): Rangifer tarandus caribou

=== Bovids, family Bovidae ===
- American bison, Bison bison (extirpated)
  - Distribution (before extirpation): Massachusetts
  - Subspecies (before extirpation): Bison bison bison

=== Right whales, family Balaenidae (coastal) ===
- North Atlantic right whale, Eubalaena glacialis (coastal, pelagic)
- Bowhead whale, Balaena mysticetus (coastal, pelagic, occasionally seen in winter)

=== Rorquals, family Balaenopteridae (coastal) ===
- Humpback whale, Megaptera novaeangliae (coastal)
- Minke whale, Balaenoptera acutorostrata (coastal)
- Sei whale, Balaeonoptera borealis (coastal)
- Fin whale, Balaeonoptera physalus (coastal)
- Blue whale, Balaeonoptera musculus (coastal)

=== Sperm whales, family Physeteridae (pelagic) ===
- Sperm whale, Physeter macrocephalus (pelagic)
- Pygmy sperm whale, Kogia breviceps (coastal)
- Dwarf sperm whale, Kogia sima (coastal)

=== Beaked whales, family Ziphiidae (pelagic) ===
- Northern bottlenose whale, Hyperoodon ampullatus (pelagic)
- Cuvier's beaked whale, Ziphius cavirostris (pelagic)
- True's beaked whale, Mesoplodon mirus (pelagic)
- Gervais' beaked whale, Mesoplodon europaeus (pelagic)
- Sowerby's beaked whale, Mesoplodon bidens (pelagic)
- Blainville's beaked whale, Mesoplodon densirostris (pelagic)

=== Beluga and Narwhal, family Monodontidae (coastal vagrant) ===
- Beluga, Delphinapterus leucus (coastal vagrant)

=== Dolphins, family Delphinidae (coastal) ===
- White-beaked dolphin, Lagenorhynchus albirostris (coastal)
- Atlantic white-sided dolphin, Leucopleurus acutus (coastal)
- Common bottlenose dolphin, Tursiops truncatus (coastal)
- Atlantic spotted dolphin, Stenella frontalis (coastal vagrant)
- Clymene dolphin, Stenella clymene (coastal vagrant)
- Spinner dolphin, Stenella longirostris (coastal vagrant)
- Striped dolphin, Stenella coeruleoalba (pelagic vagrant)
- Short-beaked common dolphin, Delphinus delphis (coastal)
- Risso's dolphin, Grampus griseus (pelagic)
- Killer whale, Orcinus orca (coastal, pelagic)
- Long-finned pilot whale, Globicephala melas (coastal)
- Short-finned pilot whale, Globicephala macrorhynchus (coastal)

=== Porpoises, family Phocoenidae (coastal) ===
- Harbor porpoise, Phocoena phocoena (coastal)

== See also ==
- List of mammals in Connecticut
- Fauna of Connecticut
- List of Massachusetts mammals
- List of Vermont mammals
- List of North American mammals
- List of regional mammals lists

== Bibliography ==
- Folkens, Pieter. 2002. Guide to Marine Mammals of the World. Alfred A. Knopf, Inc., New York.
- Grubb, Peter. 2005. Order Artiodactyla. Pp. 637–722 in Mammal Species of the World a Taxonomic and Geographic Reference. D. E. Wilson and D. M. Reeder eds. Johns Hopkins University Press, Baltimore.
- Hall, E. Raymond. 1981. The Mammals of North America. 2 volumes. Ronald Press.
- Helgen, Kristofer M. 2005. Family Castoridae. Pp. 842–843 in Mammal Species of the World a Taxonomic and Geographic Reference. D. E. Wilson and D. M. Reeder eds. Johns Hopkins University Press, Baltimore.
- Hoffman, Robert S. and Andrew T. Smith. 2005. Order Lagomorpha. Pp. 185–211 in Mammal Species of the World a Taxonomic and Geographic Reference. D. E. Wilson and D. M. Reeder eds. Johns Hopkins University Press, Baltimore.
- Hutterer, Rainer. 2005. Order Soricomorpha. Pp. 220–311 in Mammal Species of the World a Taxonomic and Geographic Reference. D. E. Wilson and D. M. Reeder eds. Johns Hopkins University Press, Baltimore.
- New England Climate Initiative. Available at: (Accessed 26 July 2006).
- Stone, K. D. and J. A. Cook. 2000. "Phylogeography of black bears (Ursus americanus) of the Pacific Northwest". Canadian Journal of Zoology, 78:1218-1223.
- Thorrington, Richard W. Jr. and Robert S. Hoffman. 2005. Family Sciuridae. Pp. 754–818 in Mammal Species of the World a Taxonomic and Geographic Reference. D. E. Wilson and D. M. Reeder eds. Johns Hopkins University Press, Baltimore.
- Whitaker, John O; Hamilton, W J. 1998. Mammals of the Eastern United States. Cornell University Press. ISBN 0801434750.
- Wozencraft, W. Christopher. 2005. Order Carnivora. Pp. 532–628 in Mammal Species of the World a Taxonomic and Geographic Reference. D. E. Wilson and D. M. Reeder eds. Johns Hopkins University Press, Baltimore.
