= Puma concolor couguar =

Puma concolor couguar may refer to:

- Eastern cougar, now extinct
- North American cougar, once commonly found in eastern North America and still prevalent in the western half of the continent
