= List of amphibians of Vermont =

The list of amphibians of Vermont includes amphibian species living in the US state of Vermont. The list does not include species found only in captivity. The Vermont state amphibian is the northern leopard frog.

== Salamanders (Urodela) ==
=== Newts (Pleurodelinae) ===
Family: Salamandridae

- Eastern (red-spotted) newt, Notophthalmus viridescens
  The eastern newt is fairly common almost statewide, but requires large mosaics of interconnected hardwoods and wetlands.

=== Advanced salamanders (Salamandroidea) ===
Family: Ambystomatidae

- Blue-spotted salamander, Ambystoma laterale
  The blue-spotted salamander, which hybridizes with the Jefferson salamander, is an uncommon species of special concern in Vermont.
- Jefferson salamander, Ambystoma jeffersonianum
  The Jefferson salamander, which hybridizes with the blue-spotted salamander, is a rare species of special concern in Vermont.
- Spotted salamander, Ambystoma maculatum
  The spotted salamander is a Species of Greatest Conservation Need as identified in the Vermont Wildlife Action Plan.
- Marbled salamander, Ambystoma opacum
  The marbled salamander is considered unconfirmed in the state of Vermont. There is a historic reference to one in Fair Haven, and a historic photo of one with Vermont written on the back of the photo, but with no details on date or location. Marbled salamanders have been found just across the Connecticut River from Vernon (in New Hampshire), and approximately 6 miles south of Vernon in Massachusetts, and may be found in Vermont at some point in the future.

=== Aquatic salamanders ===
Family: Proteidae

- Common mudpuppy, Necturus maculosus
  The mudpuppy is a rare (imperiled) species at a high risk of extinction or extirpation in Vermont; it is a Species of Greatest Conservation Need as identified in the Vermont Wildlife Action Plan.

=== Lungless salamanders (Plethodontidae) ===
Family: Plethodontidae

- Eastern red-backed salamander, Plethodon cinereus
  The eastern red-backed is found statewide, and is the most abundant salamander in Vermont.
- Four-toed salamander, Hemidactylium scutatum
  The four-toed salamander is rare in Vermont.
- Northern dusky salamander, Desmognathus fuscus
- Northern two-lined salamander, Eurycea bislineata
- Spring salamander, Gyrinophilus porphyriticus
  The spring salamander is uncommon (vulnerable) in the state of Vermont.
- Allegheny Mountain dusky salamander, Desmognathus ochrophaeus
  The Allegheny Mountain dusky salamander has been reported in Vermont, but insufficient documentation exists to confirm its presence in the state.

== Frogs (Anura), including toads ==
=== Frogs ===
Family: Hylidae

- Boreal chorus frog, Pseudacris maculata
  They were historically found in Grand Isle and Franklin counties in northwest Vermont, but have not been seen or heard since 1999.
- Gray treefrog, Dryophytes versicolor

Family: Ranidae

- American bullfrog, Lithobates catesbeianus. Rana catesbeiana
- Green frog, Lithobates clamitans, Rana clamitans
- Mink frog, Lithobates septentrionalis, Rana septentrionalis
  Uncommon in Vermont, occurring mostly in the northeastern part of the state.
- Northern leopard frog, Lithobates pipiens, Rana pipiens
  The northern leopard frog is the Vermont state amphibian.
- Pickerel frog, Lithobates palustris, Rana palustris
  The pickerel frog is the only poisonous frog native to Vermont.
- Spring peeper, Pseudacris crucifer
  Spring peepers are very common in Vermont.
- Wood frog, Lithobates sylvaticus
  Wood frogs are very common in Vermont and have been found in almost every town.

=== Toads ===
Family: Bufonidae

- American toad, Anaxyrus americanus
- Fowler's toad, Anaxyrus fowleri
  Fowler's toad is very rare in Vermont, and has been found only in the southern Connecticut River Valley.

== See also ==
- List of birds of Vermont
- List of mammals of Vermont
- List of reptiles of Vermont
- List of regional amphibians lists
- List of prehistoric amphibians
- Amphibian classification
- List of amphibians
- AmphibiaWeb
