= List of reptiles of Vermont =

The list of reptiles of Vermont includes all reptile species living in the US state of Vermont. The list does not include species found only in captivity. The State Reptile of Vermont is the painted turtle.

This list is based on the list of Reptiles and Amphibians of Vermont published by the Vermont Fish & Wildlife Department. As of March 2022 there were 21 species of reptiles on the list. The following sources are used for supplementation and corroboration:

- Entries in the Vermont Reptile and Amphibian Atlas
- Entries in the Vermont Atlas of Life, published by the Vermont Center for Ecostudies
- A list of Rare and Uncommon Animals of Vermont, published by the Vermont Department of Fish and Wildlife

== Turtles (Testudines) ==
- Snapping turtle, Chelydra serpentina
- Painted turtle, Chrysemys picta
  The painted turtle is the Vermont State Reptile.
- Spotted turtle, Clemmys guttata
  Very rare and endangered in Vermont; considered a Species of Greatest Conservation Need as identified in the Vermont Wildlife Action Plan. Its status, under the federal Endangered Species Act, is under review.
- Wood turtle, Glyptemys insculpta
  The wood turtle is uncommon (vulnerable) in Vermont, and considered a Species of Greatest Conservation Need as identified in the Vermont Wildlife Action Plan. Wood turtles have been petitioned for listing under the Endangered Species Act.
- Northern map turtle, Graptemys geographica
  Uncommon in Vermont.
- Eastern box turtle, Terrapene carolina
- Eastern musk turtle (stinkpot), Sternotherus odoratus
  Rare in Vermont.
- Spiny softshell turtle, Apalone spinifera
  Very rare in Vermont.

== Lizards and snakes (Squamata) ==
=== Lizards ===
- Common five-lined skink, Plestiodon fasciatus
  Very rare in Vermont.

=== Snakes ===
- North American racer, Coluber constrictor
  Very rare in Vermont.
- Ring-necked snake, Diadophis punctatus
- Eastern hog-nosed snake, Heterodon platirhinos
- Eastern milksnake, Lampropeltis triangulum
- Common watersnake, Nerodia sipedon
  Uncommon in Vermont.
- Smooth greensnake, Opheodrys vernalis
  Relatively uncommon in Vermont.
- Eastern ratsnake, Pantherophis alleghaniensis
  Rare in Vermont.
- DeKay's brownsnake, Storeria dekayi
  Populations are small and highly localized.
- Red-bellied snake, Storeria occipitomaculata
- Eastern ribbonsnake, Thamnophis saurita
  One of the rarest of snakes in Vermont.
- Common gartersnake, Thamnophis sirtalis
  Both T. s. sirtalis (Linnaeus, 1758) – eastern garter snake, and T. s. pallidulus (Allen, 1899) – maritime garter snake.
- Timber rattlesnake, Crotalus horridus
  Very rare in Vermont.

== See also ==
- List of birds of Vermont
- List of mammals of Vermont
- List of amphibians of Vermont
- List of regional reptiles lists
- Evolution of reptiles
- Reptile classification
- List of reptiles
