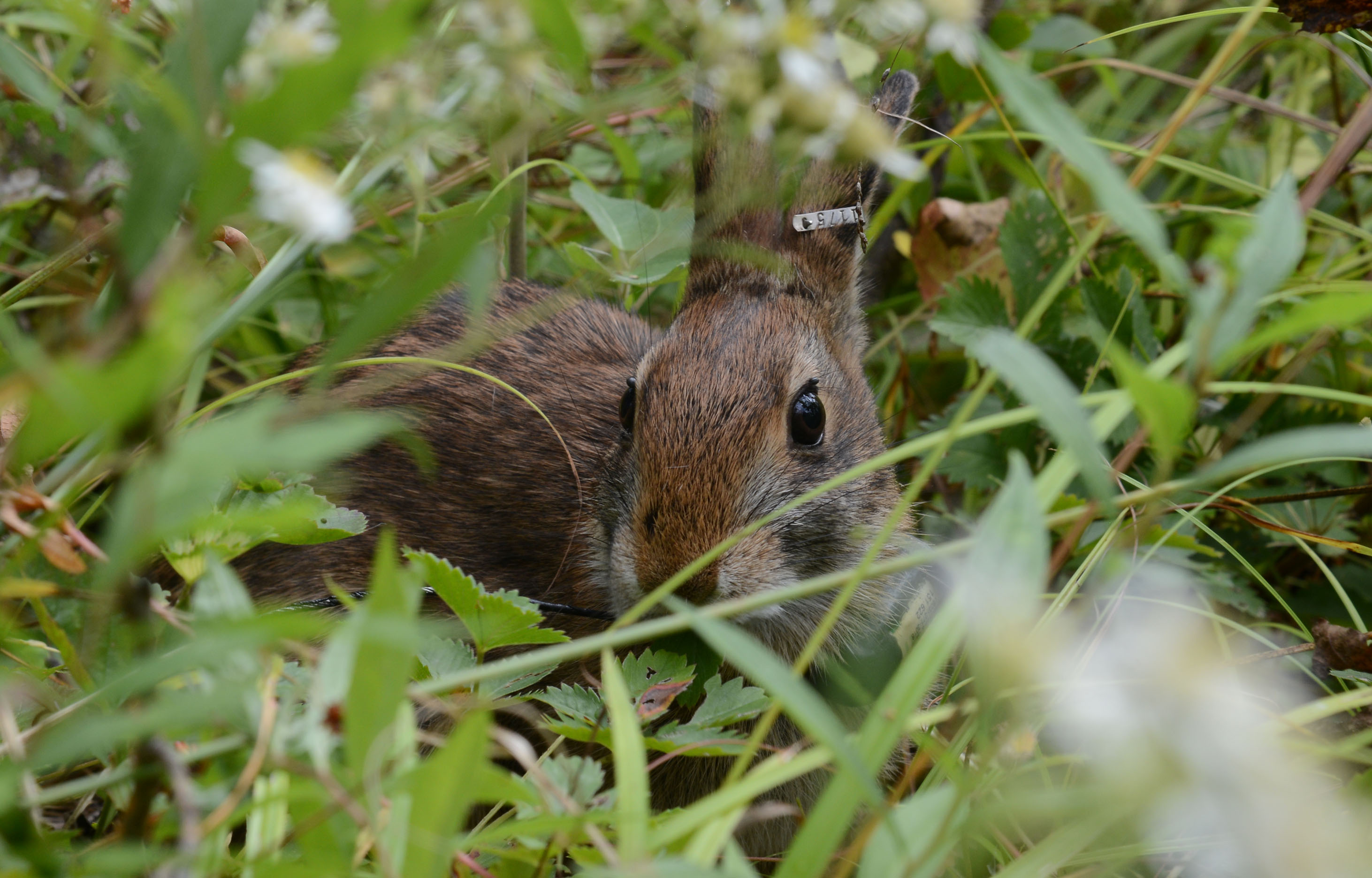

Conservation status
- Vulnerable (IUCN 3.1)

- Vulnerable (NatureServe)

Scientific classification
- Kingdom: Animalia
- Phylum: Chordata
- Class: Mammalia
- Infraclass: Placentalia
- Order: Lagomorpha
- Family: Leporidae
- Genus: Sylvilagus
- Species: S. transitionalis

Binomial name
- Sylvilagus transitionalis (Bangs, 1895)
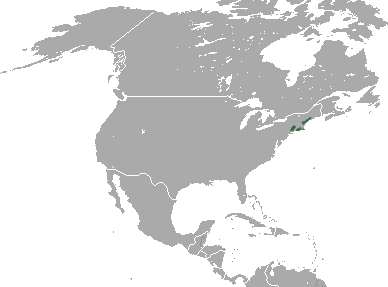
- New England cottontail range

= New England cottontail =

Species of mammal

The New England cottontail (Sylvilagus transitionalis), also known as the gray rabbit, brush rabbit, wood hare, wood rabbit, or cooney, is a species of cottontail rabbit that appears in fragmented populations across New England and the state of New York, specifically from southern Maine to southern New York. This species bears a close resemblance to the eastern cottontail (Sylvilagus floridanus), which has been introduced in much of the New England cottontail home range. The eastern cottontail is now more common in it.

In 2006, it was estimated that the current area of occupancy in its historic range is 12,180 km^{2} (4,700 sq mi) - some 86% less than the occupied range in 1960. Because of this decrease in this species' numbers and habitat, the New England cottontail is a candidate for protection under the Endangered Species Act. Cottontail hunting has been restricted in some areas where the eastern and New England cottontail species coexist in order to protect the remaining New England cottontail population.

Rabbits require habitat patches of at least 12 acres (4.9 hectares) to maintain a stable population. In New Hampshire, the number of identified patches dropped from 20 to eight in the early 2000s. The ideal habitat is 25 acres (10 hectares) of continuous early successional habitat within a larger landscape that provides shrub wetlands and dense thickets. Federal funding has been used for habitat restoration work on state lands, including the planting of shrubs and other growth critical to the rabbit's habitat. Funding has also been made available to private landowners who are willing to create thicket-type brush habitat which does not have much economic value.

== Characteristics ==
The New England cottontail is a medium-sized rabbit almost identical to the eastern cottontail. The two species look nearly identical, and can only be reliably distinguished by genetic testing of tissue, through fecal samples (i.e., of rabbit pellets), or by an examination of the rabbits' skulls, which shows a key morphological distinction: the frontonasal skull sutures of the eastern cottontail are smooth lines, while the New England cottontail's are jagged or interdigitated. The New England cottontail also typically has black hair between and on the rear surface of the ears, which the eastern cottontail lacks.

The New England cottontail is identical in fur patterns and morphology to the closely related Appalachian cottontail (Sylvilagus obscurus), though their ranges do not overlap. Individuals can only be distinguished by their differing numbers of chromosomes and subtle differences in skeletal size.

The New England cottontail weighs between 2.194 and 2.970 pounds (995 and 1,347 g) and is between 15.7 and 17.3 inches (398 and 439 mm) long. It has a dark brown coat with a "penciled effect", and a tail with white on the underside. It is sexually dimorphic, with females being larger than males.

== Distribution and habitat ==
The New England cottontail lives in the New England region of the United States. Habitat destruction has limited its modern range to less than 25 percent of its historic range. The United States Fish and Wildlife Service (USFWS) wrote in 2011 that:

As recently as 1960, New England cottontails were found east of the Hudson River in New York, across all of Connecticut, Rhode Island and Massachusetts, north to southern Vermont and New Hampshire, and into southern Maine. Today, this rabbit's range has shrunk by more than 75 percent. Its numbers are so greatly diminished that it can no longer be found in Vermont and has been reduced to only five smaller populations throughout its historic range.

According to a 2019 study, the New England cottontail's historic range also included a small part of southern Quebec, from which it is extirpated.

The major factor in the decline of the New England cottontail population and the restriction of its range is habitat destruction leading to reduced thicket habitat. Before European settlement, New England cottontails likely were found along river valleys, where disturbances in the forest—such as beaver activity, ice storms, hurricanes, and wildfires—promoted thicket growth. The clearing of much of the New England forest, as well as economic development, has eliminated a large portion of New England cottontail habitat. Other species that depend on thickets — including some birds (such as the American woodcock, eastern towhee, golden-winged warbler, blue-winged warbler, yellow-breasted chat, brown thrasher, prairie warbler and indigo bunting) and reptiles (such as the black racer, smooth green snake, and wood turtle) — have also declined.

Various other factors also contributed to the decline of New England cottontails:

- The introduction of more than 200,000 eastern cottontails (Sylvilagus floridanus) in the early 20th century, mostly by hunting clubs, greatly harmed the New England cottontail because the eastern cottontails are a generalist species are able to survive in a wide variety of habitats (fields, farms and forest edges) and have a slightly better ability to avoid predators. The competition from the eastern cottontail led to the displacement of the New England cottontail.
- The introduction of invasive plant species such as multiflora rose (Rosa multiflora), honeysuckle bush (Lonicera maackii), and autumn olive (Elaeagnus umbellata) in the 20th century may have displaced many native species that the New England cottontail relied upon for food.
- An increase in the population and density of white-tailed deer (Odocoileus virginianus) in the same range as the New England cottontail damaged populations, because deer eat many of the same plants and damage the density of understory plants providing vital thicket habitat.

In 2011, researchers from the University of Rhode Island (URI) reported that a survey found that the New England cottontail was on the verge of local extinction in Rhode Island, because of habitat loss, competition from eastern cottontails, and increased predator populations. The URI study collected nearly a thousand pellet samples from more than 100 locations; DNA testing of the samples showed that only one contained the DNA of the New England cottontail. A habitat analysis was conducted on an island in Narragansett Bay with no known past population by either cottontail species, as a possible refugium for the New England cottontail.

The New York State Department of Environmental Conservation (NYSDEC) also states that the New England cottontail's range in the state has been dramatically reduced because of habitat destruction and competition with the eastern cottontail. Moreover, the New England cottontail and the eastern cottontail look nearly identical. As a result, it is difficult to determine the New England cottontails' distribution. The NYSDEC's New England Cottontail Initiative encourages rabbit hunters to submit whole heads from rabbits they have killed east of the Hudson River to the department so they can be examined to help determine the New England cottontail's range.

According to the Nantucket Conservation Foundation, the New England cottontail occurs on Nantucket. Formerly, the species was thought to be extirpated on the island since the late 1990s, but the Nantucket Conservation Foundation and USFWS believe that because the island still contains large shrubland habitat areas, there might still be a remnant New England cottontail population. In 2013, a DNA sample from a rabbit captured on Nantucket Conservation Foundation-owned Ram Pasture property in 2011 tested positive as a New England cottontail, showing that the rabbit still exists on Nantucket.

=== Habitat ===
The New England cottontail is a habitat specialist and prefers woodlands with higher elevation in northern latitudes. It thrives in early successional forests—young forests (usually less than 25 years old) with a dense understory of thick, tangled scrubland or brushland vegetation. Blueberry and mountain laurel plants are preferred. Studies indicate that as these forests matured into closed-canopy stands and the shrub layer began to thin in the 1960s, the New England cottontail habitat declined.

== Ecology and behavior ==
New England cottontails create nests in depressions, some 4.7 in (12 cm) deep by 3.9 in (10 cm) wide, lining them with grasses and fur. New England cottontails are reticent to leave cover, being noted as rarely straying more than 16 feet (5 m) from shelter.

=== Reproduction and development ===
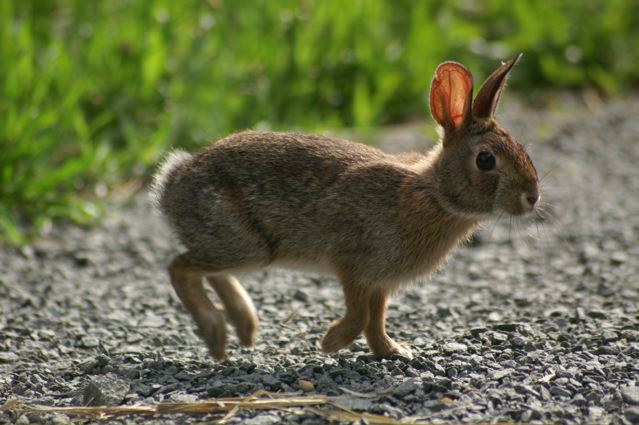
Juvenile New England cottontail

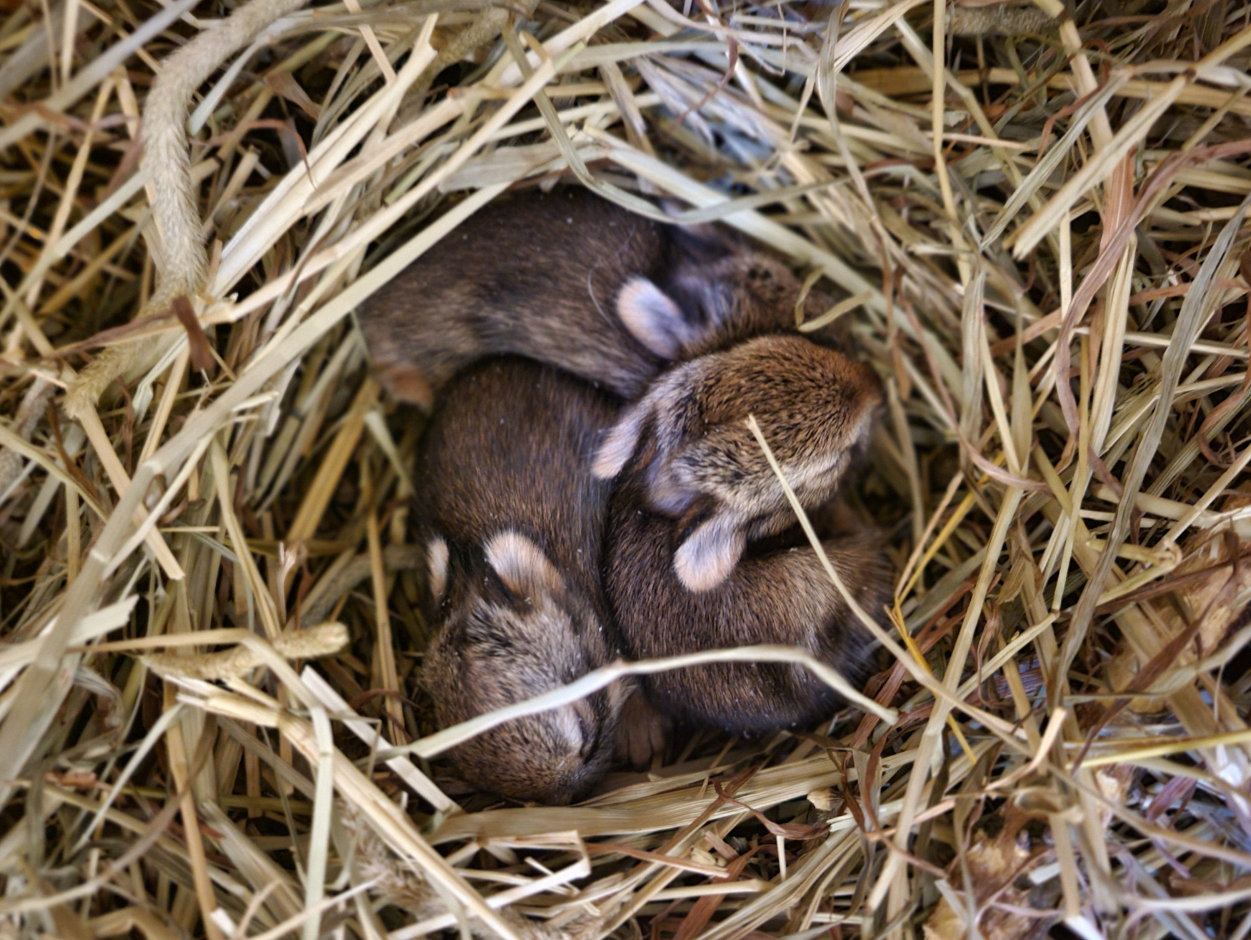
New England cottontail kits at the Roger Williams Park Zoo in Providence, Rhode Island, on May 12, 2023.

New England cottontails breed two to three times a year. Generally, the testes of male New England cottontails begin to enlarge in late December. The breeding season varies based on local elevation and latitude, reportedly spanning from January to September. In Connecticut, this season spans mid-March to mid-September, and in Maine from April to August. Pregnant female New England cottontails have been observed between April and August. The gestation period is around 28 days. Litter sizes range from three to eight, with an average of 5.2 (as given by one source) or 3.5 (as given by another). Generally, cottontails who live in more northern habitats have shorter gestation periods and larger litters, so they produce more litters during warmer weather.

Throughout its mating season, the male New England cottontail will form breeding groups centered around dominant females in regions of accessible shelter and food. New England cottontails conduct a courtship display involving running and jumping, which includes displays where one rabbit will jump over the other. Females remain apparently indifferent to males up until the point of being paired off, after which they display dominance throughout the periods of nesting, birth, and nursing. This behavior is done to avoid harassment by uninvolved males. Immediately following birth, paired New England cottontails may mate again. New England cottontails and eastern cottontails do not interbreed.

Like all cottontails, the New England cottontail has a short lifespan, typically surviving a maximum of three years in the wild. Moreover, an average of only 15 percent of young survive their first year. New England cottontails reach sexual maturity early, at no more than one year old, and many juvenile New England cottontails will breed in their first season.

The young are altricial, and are born helpless, being naked and not opening their eyes for several days. Males have no parental investment in their young, while female cottontails nurse them in the nest for roughly 16 days.

=== Diet ===
New England cottontails are herbivores whose diet varies based on the season and local forage opportunities. In the spring and summer, the New England cottontail primarily eats herbaceous plants (including leaves, stems, wood, bark, flowers, fruits, and seeds) from grasses and forbs. Beginning in the fall and continuing into the winter, New England cottontails transition to mostly woody plants.

=== Predation ===
Known predators of New England cottontails include weasels (Mustela and Neogale sp.), domestic cats (Felis catus), red foxes (Vulpes vulpes), fishers (Pekania pennanti), birds of prey (Falconiformes), coyotes (Canis latrans), and bobcats (Lynx rufus). Past predators may have included gray wolves (Canis lupus), eastern cougars (Puma concolor), wolverines (Gulo gulo), and Canada lynx (Lynx canadensis). To avoid predators, the New England cottontails run for cover; "freeze" and rely on their cryptic coloration; or, when running, follow a zig-zag pattern to confuse the predator. Because New England cottontail habitat is small and has less vegetative cover, they must forage more often in the open, leaving them vulnerable.

== Conservation ==
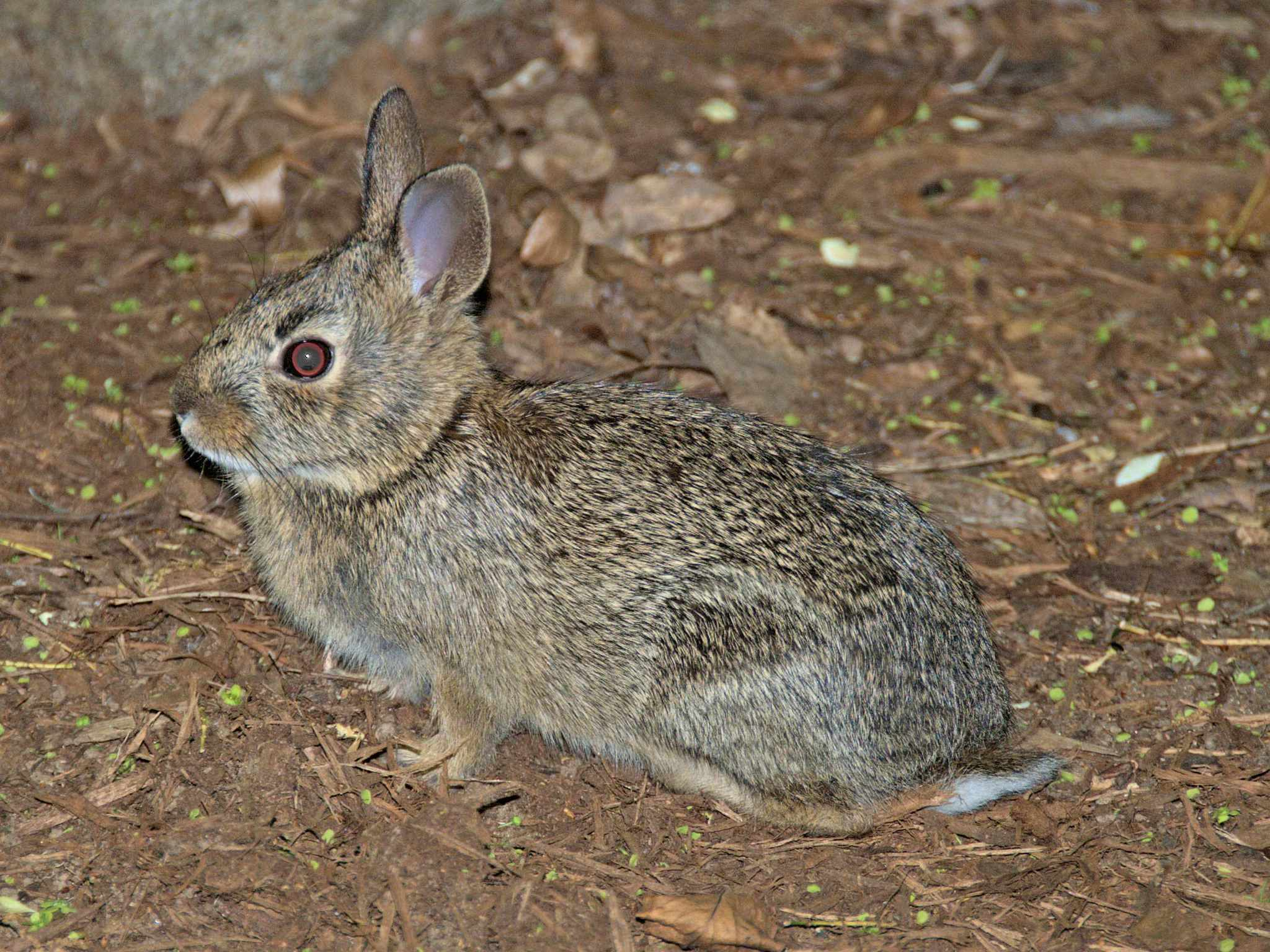
New England cottontail in Connecticut

The New England cottontail has been listed as "vulnerable" on the IUCN Red List since 1996. The species is a candidate for protection under the United States Government's Endangered Species Act (see United States Fish and Wildlife Service list of endangered species of mammals and birds) and is listed as endangered on state-level lists of Maine and New Hampshire.

The New England cottontail is listed as "vulnerable" because of its decreasing population and reduction in suitable habitat. The USFWS is surveying suitable habitat for this species. Due to its rarity, elusiveness, and the fact that it is nearly identical to the eastern cottontail, DNA analysis of fecal pellets one of the best ways to identify New England cottontail populations. New England cottontails are listed as "endangered" in New Hampshire and Maine, "extirpated" in Vermont and Quebec, a "species of special concern" in New York and Connecticut, and a "species of special interest" in Massachusetts and Rhode Island. Surveys are being conducted to identify areas for creating suitable habitat and to identify areas with extant suitable habitat that may contain remnant populations. Martha's Vineyard, Nantucket, and Connecticut are primary areas that may hold populations of the species. The USFWS has discovered populations on Nantucket and in eastern Connecticut. Additional surveys are being done to find more remnant populations in New England and New York.

In 2013, the Government of Connecticut embarked on a habitat restoration project in Litchfield County, clearing 57 acres (23 hectares) of mature woods to create a meadowland and second-growth forest needed by the rabbit.
