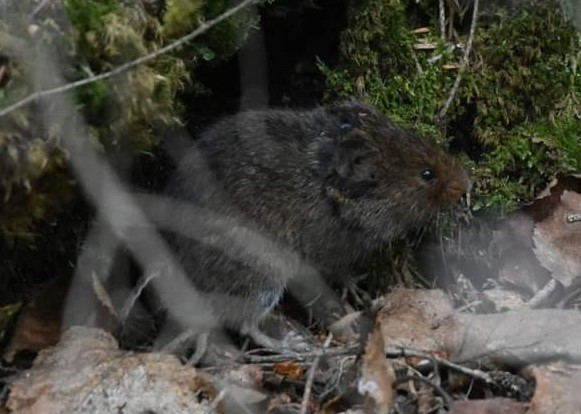

Conservation status
- Least Concern (IUCN 3.1)

Scientific classification
- Kingdom: Animalia
- Phylum: Chordata
- Class: Mammalia
- Order: Rodentia
- Family: Cricetidae
- Subfamily: Arvicolinae
- Genus: Microtus
- Subgenus: Mynomes
- Species: M. chrotorrhinus

Binomial name
- Microtus chrotorrhinus (Miller, 1894)

= Rock vole =

Species of rodent

The rock vole (Microtus chrotorrhinus), also known as the yellow-nosed vole, is a medium-sized species of vole found in eastern North America.

== Description ==
This species is similar in appearance to the larger taiga vole. It has short ears and a long tail which is paler underneath. The fur is greyish-brown with grey underparts and a yellowish nose. Its length averages 15 cm (5.9 in) long with a 5-cm tail, and it weighs about 39 g (1.4 oz).

== Habitat and distribution ==
They are found on moist rocky slopes in eastern Canada and the northeastern United States. They make runways through the surface growth and shallow burrows. They are usually found in small colonies.

== Ecology ==
They feed on grasses, mosses, underground fungi and berries (especially bunchberry), and also sometimes on caterpillars. Predators include hawks, owls, snakes and small carnivorous mammals.

== Breeding ==
The female vole has two or three litters of four to seven young. They are active year-round, mainly during the day, but are rarely seen. It has been designated as a species of concern in some parts of its range.
