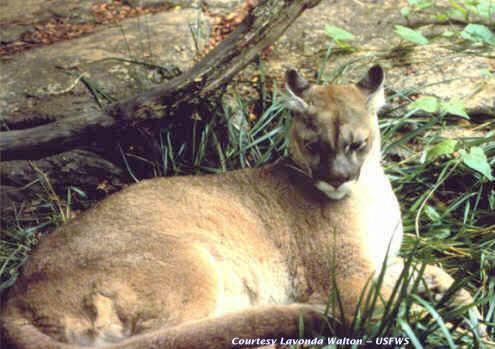

Conservation status
- Presumed Extinct (NatureServe)

Scientific classification
- Kingdom: Animalia
- Phylum: Chordata
- Class: Mammalia
- Order: Carnivora
- Family: Felidae
- Genus: Puma
- Species: P. concolor
- Subspecies: P. c. couguar
- Population: †Eastern cougar

Synonyms
- Felis couguar; Felis concolor couguar

= Eastern cougar =

Extinct population of cougar in eastern part of North America

The eastern cougar or eastern puma (Puma concolor couguar) is a subspecies designation proposed in 1946 for cougar populations in eastern North America. The subspecies as described in 1946 was declared extinct by the U.S. Fish and Wildlife Service in 2011. However, the 1946 taxonomy is now in question. The Canadian Wildlife Service has taken no position on the taxonomy. Cougars are currently common in western North America and may be expanding their range. Individuals are occasionally seen as vagrants in eastern North America.

== History of taxonomy ==
In 1892, Robert Kerr of the Royal Physical Society and Royal Society of Surgeons assigned the name Felis couguar to eastern North America cougars north of Florida. Naturalist John James Audubon in 1851 believed that cougars in both North and South America were indistinguishable. The eastern cougar was first assigned to the subspecies Felis concolor couguar and the Florida panther to F. c. coryi. Young and Goldman based their description of the eastern subspecies on their examination of eight of the existing 26 historic specimens.

In 1955, Jackson described a new subspecies, the Wisconsin puma (F. c. schorgeri), from a small sample of skulls.

A 1981 taxonomy by Hall accepted F. c. schorgeri, the Wisconsin puma, and also extended the range of the eastern puma into Nova Scotia and mapped the Florida panther's (F. c. coryi) range as far north as South Carolina and southwestern Tennessee.

In 2000, Culver et al., recommended that based on recent genetic research, all North American cougars be classified as a single subspecies, Puma concolor couguar following the oldest named subspecies (Kerr in 1792).

The 2005 edition of Mammal Species of the World followed Culver's recommendations and treated all North America cougars (including the eastern cougars) as subspecies Puma concolor couguar.

Judith Eger, a scientist at the Royal Ontario Museum in Toronto, Ontario, and the chair of the American Society of Mammalogists checklist committee, believes that the Culver work was not a proper taxonomic revision, as it offered no evaluation of the existing subspecies of the puma and failed to include morphological, ecological, and behavioral considerations. According to Eger, the Culver revision is accepted only by some puma biologists.

The U.S. Fish and Wildlife Service (FWS) continues to accept the Young and Goldman taxonomy. "While more recent genetic information introduces significant ambiguities, a full taxonomic analysis is necessary to conclude that a revision to the Young and Goldman (1946) taxonomy is warranted," the agency said in 2011.

As of 2017, the Cat Classification Taskforce of the Cat Specialist Group recognizes only two cougar subspecies: P. c. couguar for North America and possibly northwestern South America, and P. c. concolor for all other South American populations.

== Uncertainty of survival ==
A consensus exists among wildlife officials in 21 eastern states that the eastern cougar population has been extirpated from the eastern United States. The federal government of Canada has taken no position on the subspecies' existence, continued or otherwise, and terms the evidence "inconclusive."

The FWS reviewed all available research and other information, and concluded in 2011 that the eastern cougar has been extinct since the 1930s, and recommended that it be removed from its list of endangered species. The agency used the 1946 taxonomy of S.P. Young and E.A. Goldman in defining the eastern cougar subspecies. While noting that some taxonomists in recent years have classified all North American cougars within a single subspecies, the agency's 2011 report said, "a full taxonomic analysis is necessary to conclude that a revision to the Young and Goldman (1946) taxonomy is warranted."

The agency acknowledged the occasional presence of cougars in eastern North America, indicating confirmed sightings are wanderers from western breeding ranges or escaped captives. Its review expressed skepticism that breeding populations exist north of Florida, noting, among other things, the lack of consistent road kill evidence comparable to known cougar ranges. However, the presence of cougars in the wild – whatever their taxonomy or origin – in eastern North America continues to be controversial.

Various residents of eastern North America, especially in rural regions, have reported as many as 10,000 cougar sightings since the 1960s, and many continue to believe the subspecies has survived.

Bruce Wright – a wildlife biologist and former student of Aldo Leopold – popularized the idea that a breeding population of cougars persisted in northern New England and the Maritime provinces through a series of articles and books published between 1960 and 1973. Wright based his idea mostly on unconfirmed sightings, track photos, and plaster casts, and photographs of pumas killed in New Brunswick in 1932 and in Maine in 1938.

Since the 1970s, privately run groups have formed in nearly every state to compile and investigate records of cougar sightings. Many of these groups are convinced that breeding populations of cougars exist throughout the region. Some endeavor to promote the recovery of cougars in eastern North America. Large numbers of cougar sightings have been reliably reported throughout the Midwest.

=== Possible colonization of the east by western cougars ===
At least several dozen or more reported sightings have been confirmed by biologists, many of whom believe they are accounted for by escaped captives or individual members of the western subspecies that have wandered hundreds of miles from their established breeding ranges in the Dakotas or elsewhere in the west.

Eastern U.S. reported sightings, many of which reviewed in the 2011 federal report, in various locations, including Michigan, Wisconsin, Southern Indiana, Illinois, Missouri, Kentucky, Connecticut, New York, Maine, Massachusetts, New Hampshire, North Carolina, Virginia, Arkansas, Vermont, Alabama, Louisiana, and Tennessee.

Until around 1990, reports of mountain lions in the Midwest and East were highly influenced by the "Bigfoot factor", according to Mark Dowling, co-founder of the Eastern Cougar Network. "None of it was really real", he said in an interview, but the situation has changed dramatically since that time according to Dowling, whose group collects and disseminates data on the shifting mountain lion population.

Dowling said in 2003 that sightings in the eastern half of the nation, including Michigan, etc., were "almost certainly" escaped captives, but he added that the notion that (western) cougars "will eventually reach New Jersey" is a reasonable prediction, in part due to increased populations of white-tailed deer (Odocoileus virginianus).

However, some of these cougars found far in the east were established to be of western origin. As noted in an opinion piece by David Baron in the New York Times, concerning a cougar killed by a car in Connecticut in 2011:

"Wildlife officials, who at first assumed the cat was a captive animal that had escaped its owners, examined its DNA and concluded that it was a wild cougar from the Black Hills of South Dakota. It had wandered at least 1,500 miles before meeting its end at the front of an SUV in Connecticut."

Recolonization is entirely dependent upon dispersing subadult females, who typically range far less than subadult males. While subadult females with Black Hills DNA have been documented since 2015 in Tennessee, Missouri and Iowa, as of 2018, the easternmost breeding colony north of Florida is the Niobrara River Valley in central Nebraska.

In the mid-2020s isolated cases of cougar reproduction were documented in the Upper Peninsula of Michigan and in northern Minnesota, the first known cats born in either region in a century.

=== Possible reintroduction ===
A study in 2016 by several management and wildlife experts found that by reintroducing cougars to their historic range in the Northeast U.S., white-tailed deer density and deer-vehicle collisions (DVCs) could be reduced by 22%, which could prevent 21,400 human injuries, 155 fatalities, and $2.13 billion in preventive costs within just 30 years of reintroduction. The eight eastern states with the biggest areas of viable cougar habitat, as analysed in the study, were: New Hampshire and West Virginia (both 75%), Vermont and Maine (both 65%), Massachusetts (33%), Connecticut (32%), New York (31%), and Pennsylvania (29%).

=== Canadian views ===
A 1998 study for Canada's national Committee on the Status of Endangered Wildlife in Canada concluded "that there is no objective evidence (actual cougar specimens or other unequivocal confirmation) for the continuous presence of cougars since the last century anywhere in eastern Canada or the eastern United States outside of Florida." Based on this, in 1999, the magazine Canadian Geographic reported that for the previous half century, a debate over whether or not Canada's eastern woods host a cougar species all its own has raged. "Now the answer appears to be 'no.' Experts say past sightings were cases of mistaken identification."

However, the Canadian committee's website as of 2011 says that data are "insufficient" to draw conclusions regarding the subspecies' continued existence, or even whether it ever existed at all.

In March 2011, an official with the Ontario Ministry of Natural Resources stated that cougars are present in the province. This official said individual cougars in Ontario may be escaped zoo animals or pets or may have migrated from the western parts of North America.

As in the eastern U.S., numerous cougar sightings have been reported by Canadians in Ontario, Quebec, New Brunswick, Nova Scotia, and Newfoundland.

The privately run Ontario Puma Foundation estimates that 550 pumas are in the province and their numbers are increasing steadily to a sustainable population. However, no evidence of breeding has been documented east of Saskatchewan.

In 2022, the Committee on the Status of Species at Risk in Ontario assessed the cougar as a species of special concern, stating that cats are likely present in the province (due to eastward expansion of wild cougars and possibly cougars escaped from captivity) but in insufficient numbers to contribute to the conservation of the species.

=== Extinction recognized ===
In 2011, the FWS opened an extensive review into the status of the eastern cougar. In 2015, the agency determined the eastern cougar no longer warranted protection under the Endangered Species Act and planned to de-list it. On January 22, 2018 the de-listing became final and they were officially declared extinct. According to the Center for Biological Diversity, "The eastern cougar was extinct well before it was protected under the Endangered Species Act, as was the case with eight of the other 10 species that have been de-listed for extinction."

== Genetic study ==
In 2015, a group of students and scholars at the Pennsylvania State University formed a research group to sequence the mitochondrial DNA genome of this extinct subspecies. The Nittany Lion genome project took samples from preserved eastern cougar skins to obtain DNA for sequencing and further analysis. Complete mitochondrial DNA genome sequences were obtained for five of the six individuals sampled, and the results were compared to previously published cougar sequences. The researchers found that "Nittany Lions are not more similar to each other than to individuals from the Western U.S. and Florida", which strengthens the position that all North American cougars are a single subspecies.
