= List of soricines =

Species in mammal subfamily Soricinae

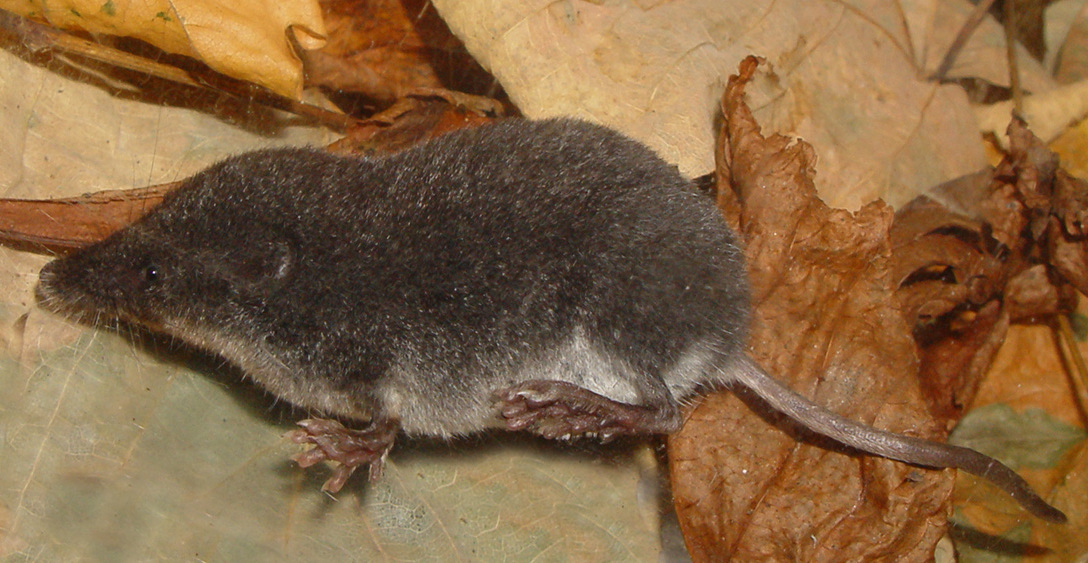
Southern water shrew (Neomys anomalus)

Soricinae is a subfamily of small mammals in the shrew family Soricidae, which in turn is part of the order Eulipotyphla. A member of this family is called a soricine or a red-toothed shrew. Soricinae is one of three subfamilies in Soricidae, along with the white-toothed shrews of Crocidurinae and the African shrews of Myosoricinae. They are found in Europe, Asia, North America, and northern South America, primarily in forests, shrublands, grasslands, and wetlands, and also in rocky areas and deserts. They range in size from the Eurasian pygmy shrew, at 3 cm (1 in) plus a 3 cm (1 in) tail, to various members of the Chimarrogale genus, at 14 cm (6 in) plus a 13 cm (5 in) tail. Soricines primarily eat insects and other invertebrates, as well as small vertebrates and plants. No soricines have population estimates, but 7 species are categorized as endangered species: the Bornean water shrew, Darién small-eared shrew, Enders's small-eared shrew, Guatemalan broad-clawed shrew, Sierra de Aroa shrew, Pribilof Island shrew, and Yalijux shrew. Additionally, the Nelson's small-eared shrew, San Cristobal shrew, and Sclater's shrew are categorized as critically endangered.

The 159 extant species of Soricinae are divided into 13 genera; 76 of them are in Sorex and 41 in Cryptotis, with the remaining 41 species divided between the other 11 genera. A few extinct prehistoric soricines have been discovered, though due to ongoing research and discoveries the exact number and categorization is not fixed.

== Conventions ==
IUCN Red List categories
Conservation status
- EX: Extinct (0 species)
- EW: Extinct in the wild (0 species)
- CR: Critically endangered (3 species)
- EN: Endangered (7 species)
- VU: Vulnerable (5 species)
- NT: Near threatened (7 species)
- LC: Least concern (105 species)

Other categories
- DD: Data deficient (28 species)
- NE: Not evaluated (1 species)

The author citation for the species or genus is given after the scientific name; parentheses around the author citation indicate that this was not the original taxonomic placement. Conservation status codes listed follow the International Union for Conservation of Nature (IUCN) Red List of Threatened Species. Range maps are provided wherever possible; if a range map is not available, a description of the soricine's range is provided. Ranges are based on the IUCN Red List for that species unless otherwise noted.

== Classification ==
The shrew subfamily Soricinae consists of 159 extant species in 13 genera. The majority of the species are contained within Cryptotis, with 41 species, and Sorex, with 76 species. The remaining shrews are split between Chodsigoa with nine species; Chimarrogale with six; Anourosorex, Episoriculus, Neomys, and Notiosorex with four species each; Blarina and Blarinella with three species each, and Megasorex, Nectogale, and Soriculus each with a single species.

Subfamily Soricinae

- Genus Anourosorex (Asian mole shrews): four species
- Genus Blarina (short-tailed shrews): three species
- Genus Blarinella (Asian short-tailed shrews): three species
- Genus Chimarrogale (Asiatic water shrews): six species
- Genus Chodsigoa (Asiatic shrews): nine species
- Genus Cryptotis (small-eared shrews): 41 species
- Genus Episoriculus (brown-toothed shrews): four species
- Genus Megasorex (Mexican shrew): one species
- Genus Nectogale (Elegant water shrew): one species
- Genus Neomys (water shrews): four species
- Genus Notiosorex (gray shrews): four species
- Genus Sorex (long-tailed shrews): 76 species
- Genus Soriculus (Himalayan shrew): one species

- Soricinae
  - - Sorex
    - - Anourosorex
      - - - Megasorex
          - Notiosorex
        - - Neomys
          - - - Chimarrogale
              - Nectogale
            - - Soriculus
              - - Chodsigoa
                - Episoriculus
  - - - Blarina
      - Cryptotis
    - Blarinella

== Soricines ==
The following classification is based on the taxonomy described by the reference work Mammal Species of the World (2005), with augmentation by generally accepted proposals made since using molecular phylogenetic analysis, as supported by both the IUCN and the American Society of Mammalogists.

Genus Anourosorex – A. Milne-Edwards, 1872 – four species
Common name	Scientific name and subspecies	Range	Size and ecology	IUCN status and estimated population
Assam mole shrew	A. assamensis Anderson, 1875	Northeastern India	Size: 8–12 cm (3–5 in) long, plus 0.5–2 cm (0.2–0.8 in) tail Habitat: Forest and rocky areas Diet: Insects and earthworms	LC Unknown
Chinese mole shrew	A. squamipes H. Milne-Edwards, 1872	Eastern Asia	Size: 8–11 cm (3–4 in), plus tail Habitat: Forest Diet: Insects and worms, as well as plants	LC Unknown
Giant mole shrew	A. schmidi Petter, 1963	Northeastern India and Bhutan	Size: 8–12 cm (3–5 in) long, plus 0.5–2 cm (0.2–0.8 in) tail Habitat: Forest Diet: Insects and earthworms	DD Unknown
Taiwanese mole shrew	A. yamashinai Kuroda, 1935	Taiwan	Size: 8–12 cm (3–5 in) long, plus 0.5–2 cm (0.2–0.8 in) tail Habitat: Forest and grassland Diet: Insects and earthworms	LC Unknown

Genus Blarina – Gray, 1838 – four species
Common name	Scientific name and subspecies	Range	Size and ecology	IUCN status and estimated population
Elliot's short-tailed shrew	B. hylophaga Elliot, 1899	Central United States	Size: 7–11 cm (3–4 in) long, plus 1–3 cm (0.4–1.2 in) tail Habitat: Grassland, shrubland, and forest Diet: Insects, arthropods, and earthworms, as well as small vertebrates and plants	LC Unknown
Everglades short-tailed shrew	B. peninsulae Merriam, 1895	Florida	Size: 7–11 cm (3–4 in) long, plus 1–3 cm (0.4–1.2 in) tail Habitat: Forest, shrubland, grassland, and inland wetlands Diet: Invertebrates, small vertebrates, and plants	NE Unknown
Northern short-tailed shrew	B. brevicauda (Say, 1823)	Eastern North America	Size: 7–11 cm (3–4 in) long, plus 1–3 cm (0.4–1.2 in) tail Habitat: Inland wetlands, shrubland, and forest Diet: Invertebrates, small vertebrates, and plants	LC Unknown
Southern short-tailed shrew	B. carolinensis (Bachman, 1837) Two subspecies: B. c. carolinensis; B. c. minima	Southeastern United States	Size: 7–11 cm (3–4 in) long, plus 1–3 cm (0.4–1.2 in) tail Habitat: Forest, shrubland, grassland, and inland wetlands Diet: Invertebrates, as well as plants	LC Unknown

Genus Blarinella – Thomas, 1911 – three species
Common name	Scientific name and subspecies	Range	Size and ecology	IUCN status and estimated population
Asiatic short-tailed shrew	B. quadraticauda H. Milne-Edwards, 1872	Central China	Size: 6–9 cm (2–4 in) long, plus 3–6 cm (1–2 in) tail Habitat: Forest and shrubland Diet: Invertebrates	NT Unknown
Burmese short-tailed shrew	B. wardi Thomas, 1915	Southern China and Myanmar	Size: 6–9 cm (2–4 in) long, plus 3–6 cm (1–2 in) tail Habitat: Forest Diet: Invertebrates	LC Unknown
Indochinese short-tailed shrew	B. griselda Thomas, 1912	Central and southern China and northern Vietnam	Size: 6–9 cm (2–4 in) long, plus 3–6 cm (1–2 in) tail Habitat: Forest Diet: Invertebrates	LC Unknown

Genus Chimarrogale – Anderson, 1877 – six species
Common name	Scientific name and subspecies	Range	Size and ecology	IUCN status and estimated population
Bornean water shrew	C. phaeura Thomas, 1898	Northern Borneo in Malaysia	Size: 8–14 cm (3–6 in) long, plus 6–13 cm (2–5 in) tail Habitat: Forest and inland wetlands Diet: Invertebrates	EN Unknown
Chinese water shrew	C. styani De Winton, 1899	Central China and Myanmar	Size: 8–14 cm (3–6 in) long, plus 6–13 cm (2–5 in) tail Habitat: Forest, shrubland, and inland wetlands Diet: Aquatic insects, crustaceans, and small fish	LC Unknown
Himalayan water shrew	C. himalayica (Gray, 1842)	Eastern Asia	Size: 11–14 cm (4–6 in) long, plus 7–9 cm (3–4 in) tail Habitat: Forest and inland wetlands Diet: Insects and spiders	LC Unknown
Japanese water shrew	C. platycephalus Temminck, 1842	Japan	Size: 8–14 cm (3–6 in) long, plus 6–13 cm (2–5 in) tail Habitat: Inland wetlands Diet: Aquatic insects, crustaceans, and small fish	LC Unknown
Malayan water shrew	C. hantu Harrison, 1958	Malaysia	Size: 8–14 cm (3–6 in) long, plus 6–13 cm (2–5 in) tail Habitat: Forest and inland wetlands Diet: Aquatic insects, crustaceans, and small fish	NT Unknown
Sumatran water shrew	C. sumatrana (Thomas, 1921)	Southern Sumatra in Indonesia	Size: 8–14 cm (3–6 in) long, plus 6–13 cm (2–5 in) tail Habitat: Forest and inland wetlands Diet: Aquatic insects, crustaceans, and small fish	DD Unknown

Genus Chodsigoa – Kastchenko, 1907 – nine species
Common name	Scientific name and subspecies	Range	Size and ecology	IUCN status and estimated population
De Winton's shrew	C. hypsibia De Winton, 1899	Central China	Size: 4–10 cm (2–4 in) long, plus 3–12 cm (1–5 in) tail Habitat: Forest and shrubland Diet: Earthworms, insects, and other invertebrates, as well as small mammals	LC Unknown
Hoffmann's long-tailed shrew	C. hoffmanni Chen, He, Huang, Wan, Liu, & Jiang, 2017	Central China and Northern Vietnam	Size: 4–10 cm (2–4 in) long, plus 3–12 cm (1–5 in) tail Habitat: Forest Diet: Earthworms, insects, and other invertebrates, as well as small mammals	LC Unknown
Lamulate shrew	C. lamula (Thomas, 1912)	Central China	Size: 4–10 cm (2–4 in) long, plus 3–12 cm (1–5 in) tail Habitat: Forest Diet: Earthworms, insects, and other invertebrates, as well as small mammals	LC Unknown
Lesser Taiwanese shrew	C. sodalis (Thomas, 1913)	Taiwan	Size: 4–10 cm (2–4 in) long, plus 3–12 cm (1–5 in) tail Habitat: Forest Diet: Earthworms, insects, and other invertebrates, as well as small mammals	DD Unknown
Lowe's shrew	C. parca (Allen, 1923) Three subspecies: C. p. furva; C. p. lowei; C. p. parca	Southern Asia	Size: 4–10 cm (2–4 in) long, plus 3–12 cm (1–5 in) tail Habitat: Forest Diet: Earthworms, insects, and other invertebrates, as well as small mammals	LC Unknown
Pygmy brown-toothed shrew	C. parva Allen, 1923	Southern China	Size: 4–10 cm (2–4 in) long, plus 3–12 cm (1–5 in) tail Habitat: Unknown Diet: Earthworms, insects, and other invertebrates, as well as small mammals	LC Unknown
Salenski's shrew	C. salenskii (Kastchenko, 1907)	Central China	Size: 4–10 cm (2–4 in) long, plus 3–12 cm (1–5 in) tail Habitat: Unknown Diet: Earthworms, insects, and other invertebrates, as well as small mammals	DD Unknown
Smith's shrew	C. smithii (Thomas, 1911)	Central China	Size: 4–10 cm (2–4 in) long, plus 3–12 cm (1–5 in) tail Habitat: Forest Diet: Earthworms, insects, and other invertebrates, as well as small mammals	NT Unknown
Van Sung's shrew	C. caovansunga (Lunde, Musser, & Son, 2003)	Northern Vietnam	Size: 4–10 cm (2–4 in) long, plus 3–12 cm (1–5 in) tail Habitat: Forest Diet: Earthworms, insects, and other invertebrates, as well as small mammals	DD Unknown

Genus Cryptotis – Pomel, 1848 – 41 species
Common name	Scientific name and subspecies	Range	Size and ecology	IUCN status and estimated population
Big Mexican small-eared shrew	C. magna (Merriam, 1895)	Southern Mexico	Size: 5–10 cm (2–4 in) long, plus 1–5 cm (0.4–2.0 in) tail Habitat: Forest Diet: Invertebrates, small lizards and frogs, and carrion	VU Unknown
Blackish small-eared shrew	C. nigrescens (J. A. Allen, 1895)	Central America	Size: 5–10 cm (2–4 in) long, plus 1–5 cm (0.4–2.0 in) tail Habitat: Forest Diet: Invertebrates, small lizards and frogs, and carrion	LC Unknown
Blind small-eared shrew	C. niausa Moreno Cárdenas & Albuja, 2014	Northern Ecuador	Size: 5–10 cm (2–4 in) long, plus 1–5 cm (0.4–2.0 in) tail Habitat: Forest, grassland, and rocky areas Diet: Invertebrates, small lizards and frogs, and carrion	DD Unknown
Celaque broad-clawed shrew	C. celaque Woodman, 2015	Western Honduras	Size: 5–10 cm (2–4 in) long, plus 1–5 cm (0.4–2.0 in) tail Habitat: Forest Diet: Invertebrates, small lizards and frogs, and carrion	DD Unknown
Central American least shrew	C. orophila (Allen, 1895)	Central America	Size: 5–10 cm (2–4 in) long, plus 1–5 cm (0.4–2.0 in) tail Habitat: Forest, shrubland, and inland wetlands Diet: Invertebrates, small lizards and frogs, and carrion	DD Unknown
Central Mexican broad-clawed shrew	C. alticola (Merriam, 1895)	Central Mexico	Size: 5–10 cm (2–4 in) long, plus 1–5 cm (0.4–2.0 in) tail Habitat: Forest and grassland Diet: Invertebrates, small lizards and frogs, and carrion	NT Unknown
Colombian small-eared shrew	C. colombiana Woodman & Timm, 1993	Central Colombia	Size: 5–10 cm (2–4 in) long, plus 1–5 cm (0.4–2.0 in) tail Habitat: Forest Diet: Invertebrates, small lizards and frogs, and carrion	LC Unknown
Darién small-eared shrew	C. merus Goldman, 1912	Border of Colombia and Panama	Size: 5–10 cm (2–4 in) long, plus 1–5 cm (0.4–2.0 in) tail Habitat: Forest Diet: Invertebrates, small lizards and frogs, and carrion	EN Unknown
Dinira small-eared shrew	C. dinirensis Quiroga-Carmona & DoNascimiento, 2016	Northern Venezuela	Size: 5–10 cm (2–4 in) long, plus 1–5 cm (0.4–2.0 in) tail Habitat: Forest Diet: Invertebrates, small lizards and frogs, and carrion	DD Unknown
Eastern Cordillera small-footed shrew	C. brachyonyx Woodman, 2003	Central Colombia	Size: 5–10 cm (2–4 in) long, plus 1–5 cm (0.4–2.0 in) tail Habitat: Unknown Diet: Invertebrates, small lizards and frogs, and carrion	DD Unknown
Ecuadorian small-eared shrew	C. equatoris Thomas, 1912	Ecuador	Size: 5–10 cm (2–4 in) long, plus 1–5 cm (0.4–2.0 in) tail Habitat: Forest and unknown Diet: Invertebrates, small lizards and frogs, and carrion	LC Unknown
Enders's small-eared shrew	C. endersi Setzer, 1950	Panama	Size: 5–10 cm (2–4 in) long, plus 1–5 cm (0.4–2.0 in) tail Habitat: Forest Diet: Invertebrates, small lizards and frogs, and carrion	EN Unknown
Goldman's broad-clawed shrew	C. goldmani (Merriam, 1895)	Southern Mexico	Size: 5–10 cm (2–4 in) long, plus 1–5 cm (0.4–2.0 in) tail Habitat: Forest Diet: Invertebrates, small lizards and frogs, and carrion	LC Unknown
Goodwin's broad-clawed shrew	C. goodwini Jackson, 1933	Southern Mexico and Central America	Size: 5–10 cm (2–4 in) long, plus 1–5 cm (0.4–2.0 in) tail Habitat: Forest Diet: Invertebrates, small lizards and frogs, and carrion	LC Unknown
Grizzled Mexican small-eared shrew	C. obscura (Merriam, 1895)	Eastern Mexico	Size: 5–10 cm (2–4 in) long, plus 1–5 cm (0.4–2.0 in) tail Habitat: Forest Diet: Invertebrates, small lizards and frogs, and carrion	LC Unknown
Guatemalan broad-clawed shrew	C. griseoventris Jackson, 1933	Southern Mexico and Guatemala	Size: 5–10 cm (2–4 in) long, plus 1–5 cm (0.4–2.0 in) tail Habitat: Forest Diet: Invertebrates, small lizards and frogs, and carrion	EN Unknown
Honduran small-eared shrew	C. hondurensis Woodman & Timm, 1992	Honduras	Size: 5–10 cm (2–4 in) long, plus 1–5 cm (0.4–2.0 in) tail Habitat: Forest Diet: Invertebrates, small lizards and frogs, and carrion	DD Unknown
Mam broad-clawed shrew	C. mam Woodman, 2010	Guatemala	Size: 5–10 cm (2–4 in) long, plus 1–5 cm (0.4–2.0 in) tail Habitat: Forest Diet: Earthworms, insects, and plants	DD Unknown
Medellín small-eared shrew	C. medellinia Thomas, 1921	Colombia	Size: 5–10 cm (2–4 in) long, plus 1–5 cm (0.4–2.0 in) tail Habitat: Forest Diet: Invertebrates, small lizards and frogs, and carrion	LC Unknown
Merida small-eared shrew	C. meridensis Thomas, 1898	Venezuela	Size: 7–11 cm (3–4 in) long, plus 2–5 cm (1–2 in) tail Habitat: Forest and shrubland Diet: Insects and other invertebrates, as well as small vertebrates and eggs	VU Unknown
Merriam's small-eared shrew	C. merriami Choate, 1970	Southern Mexico and Central America	Size: 5–10 cm (2–4 in) long, plus 1–5 cm (0.4–2.0 in) tail Habitat: Forest Diet: Invertebrates, small lizards and frogs, and carrion	LC Unknown
Mexican small-eared shrew	C. mexicana (Coues, 1870)	Southern Mexico	Size: 5–10 cm (2–4 in) long, plus 1–5 cm (0.4–2.0 in) tail Habitat: Forest Diet: Invertebrates, small lizards and frogs, and carrion	LC Unknown
Muscular broad-clawed shrew	C. lacertosus Woodman, 2010	Guatemala	Size: 5–10 cm (2–4 in) long, plus 1–5 cm (0.4–2.0 in) tail Habitat: Forest Diet: Invertebrates, small lizards and frogs, and carrion	DD Unknown
Nelson's small-eared shrew	C. nelsoni Merriam, 1895	Eastern Mexico	Size: 5–10 cm (2–4 in) long, plus 1–5 cm (0.4–2.0 in) tail Habitat: Forest and grassland Diet: Insects	CR Unknown
North American least shrew	C. parva (Say, 1823)	Eastern North America	Size: 7–10 cm (3–4 in) long, plus 1–3 cm (0.4–1.2 in) tail Habitat: Forest, shrubland, grassland, inland wetlands, and rocky areas Diet: Insects, as well as other invertebrates	LC Unknown
Oaxacan broad-clawed shrew	C. peregrina (Merriam, 1895)	Southern Mexico	Size: 5–10 cm (2–4 in) long, plus 1–5 cm (0.4–2.0 in) tail Habitat: Forest Diet: Invertebrates, small lizards and frogs, and carrion	DD Unknown
Omoa broad-clawed shrew	C. mccarthyi Woodman, 2015	Honduras	Size: 5–10 cm (2–4 in) long, plus 1–5 cm (0.4–2.0 in) tail Habitat: Forest Diet: Invertebrates, small lizards and frogs, and carrion	DD Unknown
Perija small-eared shrew	C. perijensis Quiroga-Carmona & Woodman, 2015	Border of Colombia and Venezuela	Size: 5–10 cm (2–4 in) long, plus 1–5 cm (0.4–2.0 in) tail Habitat: Forest and grassland Diet: Invertebrates, small lizards and frogs, and carrion	DD Unknown
Peruvian small-eared shrew	C. peruviensis Vivar, Pacheco, & Valqui, 1997	Northern Peru	Size: 5–10 cm (2–4 in) long, plus 1–5 cm (0.4–2.0 in) tail Habitat: Forest Diet: Invertebrates, small lizards and frogs, and carrion	DD Unknown
Phillips's small-eared shrew	C. phillipsii (Schaldach, 1966)	Southern Mexico	Size: 5–10 cm (2–4 in) long, plus 1–5 cm (0.4–2.0 in) tail Habitat: Forest Diet: Invertebrates, small lizards and frogs, and carrion	VU Unknown
Santa Barbara broad-clawed shrew	C. cavatorculus Woodman, 2015	Honduras	Size: 5–10 cm (2–4 in) long, plus 1–5 cm (0.4–2.0 in) tail Habitat: Forest Diet: Invertebrates, small lizards and frogs, and carrion	DD Unknown
Scaly-footed small-eared shrew	C. squamipes (Allen, 1916)	Colombia and Ecuador	Size: 5–10 cm (2–4 in) long, plus 1–5 cm (0.4–2.0 in) tail Habitat: Forest Diet: Invertebrates, small lizards and frogs, and carrion	LC Unknown
Sierra de Aroa shrew	C. aroensis Quiroga-Carmona & Molinari, 2012	Venezuela	Size: 5–10 cm (2–4 in) long, plus 1–5 cm (0.4–2.0 in) tail Habitat: Forest Diet: Invertebrates, small lizards and frogs, and carrion	EN Unknown
Talamancan small-eared shrew	C. gracilis Miller, 1911	Costa Rica and Panama	Size: 5–10 cm (2–4 in) long, plus 1–5 cm (0.4–2.0 in) tail Habitat: Forest and grassland Diet: Invertebrates, small lizards and frogs, and carrion	LC Unknown
Tamá small-eared shrew	C. tamensis Woodman, 2002	Border of Colombia and Venezuela	Size: 5–10 cm (2–4 in) long, plus 1–5 cm (0.4–2.0 in) tail Habitat: Forest Diet: Invertebrates, small lizards and frogs, and carrion	LC Unknown
Thomas's small-eared shrew	C. thomasi (Merriam, 1897)	Colombia	Size: 5–10 cm (2–4 in) long, plus 1–5 cm (0.4–2.0 in) tail Habitat: Forest and grassland Diet: Invertebrates, small lizards and frogs, and carrion	LC Unknown
Tropical small-eared shrew	C. tropicalis (Merriam, 1895)	Southern Mexico and Central America	Size: 5–10 cm (2–4 in) long, plus 1–5 cm (0.4–2.0 in) tail Habitat: Forest, grassland, and inland wetlands Diet: Invertebrates, small lizards and frogs, and carrion	NT Unknown
Venezuelan small-eared shrew	C. venezuelensis Quiroga-Carmona, 2013	Northern Venezuela	Size: 5–10 cm (2–4 in) long, plus 1–5 cm (0.4–2.0 in) tail Habitat: Forest Diet: Invertebrates, small lizards and frogs, and carrion	DD Unknown
Wandering small-eared shrew	C. montivaga (Anthony, 1921)	Ecuador	Size: 5–10 cm (2–4 in) long, plus 1–5 cm (0.4–2.0 in) tail Habitat: Forest Diet: Insects and other invertebrates	LC Unknown
Yalijux shrew	C. oreoryctes Woodman, 2011	Guatemala	Size: 5–10 cm (2–4 in) long, plus 1–5 cm (0.4–2.0 in) tail Habitat: Forest Diet: Invertebrates, small lizards and frogs, and carrion	EN Unknown
Yucatan small-eared shrew	C. mayensis (Merriam, 1901)	Southern Mexico and Central America	Size: 5–10 cm (2–4 in) long, plus 1–5 cm (0.4–2.0 in) tail Habitat: Forest Diet: Invertebrates, small lizards and frogs, and carrion	LC Unknown

Genus Episoriculus – Ellerman & Morrison-Scott, 1966 – four species
Common name	Scientific name and subspecies	Range	Size and ecology	IUCN status and estimated population
Hodgson's brown-toothed shrew	E. caudatus (Horsfield, 1851)	Southern Asia	Size: 4–7 cm (2–3 in) long, plus 3–7 cm (1–3 in) tail Habitat: Forest, shrubland, and grassland Diet: Earthworms, insects, and other invertebrates, as well as small mammals	LC Unknown
Long-tailed brown-toothed shrew	E. leucops (Horsfield, 1855)	Southern Asia	Size: 4–7 cm (2–3 in) long, plus 3–7 cm (1–3 in) tail Habitat: Forest Diet: Earthworms, insects, and other invertebrates, as well as small mammals	LC Unknown
Long-tailed mountain shrew	E. macrurus Blanford, 1888	Southern Asia	Size: 4–7 cm (2–3 in) long, plus 3–7 cm (1–3 in) tail Habitat: Forest Diet: Earthworms, insects, and other invertebrates, as well as small mammals	LC Unknown
Taiwanese brown-toothed shrew	E. fumidus (Thomas, 1913)	Taiwan	Size: 4–7 cm (2–3 in) long, plus 3–7 cm (1–3 in) tail Habitat: Forest and shrubland Diet: Earthworms, insects, and other invertebrates, as well as small mammals	LC Unknown

Genus Megasorex – Hibbard, 1950 – one species
Common name	Scientific name and subspecies	Range	Size and ecology	IUCN status and estimated population
Mexican shrew	M. gigas (Merriam, 1897)	Southern Mexico	Size: 8–9 cm (3–4 in) long, plus 3–5 cm (1–2 in) tail Habitat: Forest and shrubland Diet: Invertebrates	LC Unknown

Genus Nectogale – A. Milne-Edwards, 1870 – one species
Common name	Scientific name and subspecies	Range	Size and ecology	IUCN status and estimated population
Elegant water shrew	N. elegans H. Milne-Edwards, 1870	Central China and southern Asia	Size: 9–13 cm (4–5 in) long, plus 8–11 cm (3–4 in) tail Habitat: Forest and inland wetlands Diet: Insects, crustaceans, and small fish	LC Unknown

Genus Neomys – Kaup, 1829 – four species
Common name	Scientific name and subspecies	Range	Size and ecology	IUCN status and estimated population
Eurasian water shrew	N. fodiens (Pennant, 1771)	Europe and Asia	Size: 6–10 cm (2–4 in) long, plus 4–8 cm (2–3 in) tail Habitat: Forest, grassland, inland wetlands, intertidal marine, and coastal marine Diet: Aquatic invertebrates, fish, amphibians, and frogs	LC Unknown
Iberian water shrew	N. anomalus A. Cabrera, 1907	Western Europe	Size: 6–10 cm (2–4 in) long, plus 4–8 cm (2–3 in) tail Habitat: Inland wetlands Diet: Invertebrates and small vertebrates such as fish and frogs	LC Unknown
Mediterranean water shrew	N. milleri Mottaz, 1907	Europe and western Asia	Size: 6–10 cm (2–4 in) long, plus 4–8 cm (2–3 in) tail Habitat: Inland wetlands Diet: Invertebrates and small vertebrates such as fish and frogs	LC Unknown
Transcaucasian water shrew	N. teres Miller, 1908	Western Asia	Size: 6–10 cm (2–4 in) long, plus 4–8 cm (2–3 in) tail Habitat: Forest and inland wetlands Diet: Invertebrates, molluscs, fish, frogs, and small rodents	LC Unknown

Genus Notiosorex – Coues, 1877 – four species
Common name	Scientific name and subspecies	Range	Size and ecology	IUCN status and estimated population
Cockrum's gray shrew	N. cockrumi Baker, O'Neill, & McAliley, 2003	Northern Mexico and southern United States	Size: 4–7 cm (2–3 in) long, plus 2–4 cm (1–2 in) tail Habitat: Shrubland and desert Diet: Insects and other invertebrates, as well as carrion	LC Unknown
Crawford's gray shrew	N. crawfordi (Coues, 1877)	Southern North America	Size: 4–7 cm (2–3 in) long, plus 2–4 cm (1–2 in) tail Habitat: Forest, shrubland, grassland, and desert Diet: Worms, spiders, and insects, as well as small mammals, lizards, and birds	LC Unknown
Large-eared gray shrew	N. evotis (Coues, 1877)	Western Mexico	Size: 4–7 cm (2–3 in) long, plus 2–4 cm (1–2 in) tail Habitat: Shrubland and grassland Diet: Insects and other invertebrates, as well as carrion	LC Unknown
Villa's gray shrew	N. villai Carraway & Timm, 2000	Eastern Mexico	Size: 4–7 cm (2–3 in) long, plus 2–4 cm (1–2 in) tail Habitat: Forest Diet: Insects and other invertebrates, as well as carrion	VU Unknown

Genus Sorex – Linnaeus, 1758 – 76 species
Common name	Scientific name and subspecies	Range	Size and ecology	IUCN status and estimated population
Alaska tiny shrew	S. yukonicus Dokuchaev, 1997	Alaska	Size: 4–10 cm (2–4 in) long, plus 2–9 cm (1–4 in) tail Habitat: Inland wetlands Diet: Insects, worms, and other invertebrates, as well as small vertebrates, carrion, and plants	LC Unknown
Alpine shrew	S. alpinus Schinz, 1837	Europe	Size: 6–8 cm (2–3 in) long, plus 5–8 cm (2–3 in) tail Habitat: Forest, grassland, and rocky areas Diet: Insects, arachnids, snails, and earthworms	NT Unknown
American pygmy shrew	S. hoyi Baird, 1857	Northern North America	Size: 5–6 cm (2 in) long, plus 2–4 cm (1–2 in) tail Habitat: Forest, shrubland, grassland, and inland wetlands Diet: Insects and other invertebrates	LC Unknown
American water shrew	S. palustris Richardson, 1828	North America	Size: 7–9 cm (3–4 in) long, plus 5–9 cm (2–4 in) tail Habitat: Forest and inland wetlands Diet: Aquatic insects and fish, as well as other invertebrates and plants	LC Unknown
Apennine shrew	S. samniticus Altobello, 1926	Italy	Size: 4–10 cm (2–4 in) long, plus 2–9 cm (1–4 in) tail Habitat: Shrubland and forest Diet: Insects, worms, and other invertebrates, as well as small vertebrates, carrion, and plants	LC Unknown
Arctic shrew	S. arcticus Kerr, 1792	Northern North America	Size: 6–8 cm (2–3 in) long, plus 3–5 cm (1–2 in) tail Habitat: Forest and inland wetlands Diet: Insects and other invertebrates	LC Unknown
Arizona shrew	S. arizonae Diersing & Hoffmeister, 1977	Northern Mexico and southern United States	Size: 4–10 cm (2–4 in) long, plus 2–9 cm (1–4 in) tail Habitat: Forest and inland wetlands Diet: Insects, worms, and other invertebrates, as well as small vertebrates, carrion, and plants	LC Unknown
Azumi shrew	S. hosonoi Imaizumi, 1954	Japan	Size: 4–10 cm (2–4 in) long, plus 2–9 cm (1–4 in) tail Habitat: Forest, shrubland, and grassland Diet: Insects, worms, and other invertebrates, as well as small vertebrates, carrion, and plants	LC Unknown
Baird's shrew	S. bairdi Merriam, 1895	Northwestern United States	Size: 4–10 cm (2–4 in) long, plus 2–9 cm (1–4 in) tail Habitat: Forest Diet: Invertebrates	LC Unknown
Barren ground shrew	S. ugyunak Anderson & Rand, 1945	Northern North America	Size: 4–10 cm (2–4 in) long, plus 2–9 cm (1–4 in) tail Habitat: Grassland Diet: Insects, worms, and other invertebrates, as well as small vertebrates, carrion, and plants	LC Unknown
Buchara shrew	S. buchariensis Ognew, 1921	Central Asia	Size: 4–10 cm (2–4 in) long, plus 2–9 cm (1–4 in) tail Habitat: Forest Diet: Insects	DD Unknown
Carmen Mountain shrew	S. milleri Jackson, 1947	Northeastern Mexico	Size: 4–10 cm (2–4 in) long, plus 2–9 cm (1–4 in) tail Habitat: Forest Diet: Insects	VU Unknown
Caucasian pygmy shrew	S. volnuchini Ognew, 1922	Western Asia	Size: 4–10 cm (2–4 in) long, plus 2–9 cm (1–4 in) tail Habitat: Forest and grassland Diet: Insects, worms, and other invertebrates, as well as small vertebrates, carrion, and plants	LC Unknown
Caucasian shrew	S. satunini Ognew, 1922	Western Asia	Size: 4–10 cm (2–4 in) long, plus 2–9 cm (1–4 in) tail Habitat: Forest and rocky areas Diet: Insects	LC Unknown
Chestnut-bellied shrew	S. ventralis Merriam, 1895	Southern Mexico	Size: 4–10 cm (2–4 in) long, plus 2–9 cm (1–4 in) tail Habitat: Forest and grassland Diet: Insects, worms, and other invertebrates, as well as small vertebrates, carrion, and plants	LC Unknown
Chinese highland shrew	S. excelsus Allen, 1923	Southern China	Size: 4–10 cm (2–4 in) long, plus 2–9 cm (1–4 in) tail Habitat: Forest, shrubland, and grassland Diet: Insects, worms, and other invertebrates, as well as small vertebrates, carrion, and plants	LC Unknown
Chinese shrew	S. sinalis Thomas, 1912	Central China	Size: 4–10 cm (2–4 in) long, plus 2–9 cm (1–4 in) tail Habitat: Rocky areas Diet: Insects, worms, and other invertebrates, as well as small vertebrates, carrion, and plants	DD Unknown
Cinereus shrew	S. cinereus Kerr, 1792	Northern North America	Size: 4–10 cm (2–4 in) long, plus 2–9 cm (1–4 in) tail Habitat: Forest, shrubland, grassland, and inland wetlands Diet: A variety of invertebrates, as well as seeds and fungi	LC Unknown
Common shrew	S. araneus Linnaeus, 1758	Europe and Asia	Size: 4–10 cm (2–4 in) long, plus 2–9 cm (1–4 in) tail Habitat: Forest, shrubland, inland wetlands, and coastal marine Diet: Insects and other invertebrates	LC Unknown
Crowned shrew	S. coronatus Millet, 1828	Western Europe	Size: 4–10 cm (2–4 in) long, plus 2–9 cm (1–4 in) tail Habitat: Forest, shrubland, and inland wetlands Diet: Insects, worms, and other invertebrates, as well as small vertebrates, carrion, and plants	LC Unknown
Dwarf shrew	S. nanus Merriam, 1895	Central United States	Size: 4–10 cm (2–4 in) long, plus 2–9 cm (1–4 in) tail Habitat: Rocky areas, inland wetlands, grassland, and forest Diet: Insects and other invertebrates, as well as plants and small vertebrates	LC Unknown
Eurasian least shrew	S. minutissimus Zimmermann, 1780	Northern Europe and northern Asia	Size: 4–10 cm (2–4 in) long, plus 2–9 cm (1–4 in) tail Habitat: Forest and grassland Diet: Insects and other invertebrates	LC Unknown
Eurasian pygmy shrew	S. minutus Linnaeus, 1766	Europe and Asia	Size: 3–6 cm (1–2 in) long, plus 3–5 cm (1–2 in) tail Habitat: Forest, shrubland, grassland, inland wetlands, and coastal marine Diet: Insects and other invertebrates	LC Unknown
Flat-skulled shrew	S. roboratus Hollister, 1913	Northern Asia	Size: 4–10 cm (2–4 in) long, plus 2–9 cm (1–4 in) tail Habitat: Forest Diet: Insects	LC Unknown
Fog shrew	S. sonomae Jackson, 1921 Two subspecies: S. s. sonomae; S. s. tenelliodus	Western North America	Size: 4–10 cm (2–4 in) long, plus 2–9 cm (1–4 in) tail Habitat: Forest and inland wetlands Diet: Insects and other invertebrates	LC Unknown
Gansu shrew	S. cansulus Thomas, 1912	Central China	Size: 4–10 cm (2–4 in) long, plus 2–9 cm (1–4 in) tail Habitat: Unknown Diet: Insects, worms, and other invertebrates, as well as small vertebrates, carrion, and plants	LC Unknown
Glacier Bay water shrew	S. alaskanus Merriam, 1900	Western Canada	Size: 4–10 cm (2–4 in) long, plus 2–9 cm (1–4 in) tail Habitat: Inland wetlands Diet: Insects, worms, and other invertebrates, as well as small vertebrates, carrion, and plants	DD Unknown
Greater stripe-backed shrew	S. cylindricauda H. Milne-Edwards, 1872	Central China	Size: 4–10 cm (2–4 in) long, plus 2–9 cm (1–4 in) tail Habitat: Forest Diet: Insects, worms, and other invertebrates, as well as small vertebrates, carrion, and plants	LC Unknown
Iberian shrew	S. granarius Miller, 1910	Portugal and Spain	Size: 4–10 cm (2–4 in) long, plus 2–9 cm (1–4 in) tail Habitat: Forest, shrubland, and rocky areas Diet: Insects, worms, and other invertebrates, as well as small vertebrates, carrion, and plants	LC Unknown
Inyo shrew	S. tenellus Merriam, 1895	Western United States	Size: 4–10 cm (2–4 in) long, plus 2–9 cm (1–4 in) tail Habitat: Forest, shrubland, inland wetlands, and rocky areas Diet: Insects and other invertebrates	LC Unknown
Ixtlan shrew	S. ixtlanensis Carraway, 2007	Southern Mexico	Size: 4–10 cm (2–4 in) long, plus 2–9 cm (1–4 in) tail Habitat: Forest Diet: Insects, worms, and other invertebrates, as well as small vertebrates, carrion, and plants	DD Unknown
Jalisco shrew	S. mediopua Carraway, 2007	Southern Mexico	Size: 4–10 cm (2–4 in) long, plus 2–9 cm (1–4 in) tail Habitat: Forest Diet: Insects, worms, and other invertebrates, as well as small vertebrates, carrion, and plants	LC Unknown
Kamchatka shrew	S. camtschatica Yudin, 1972	Eastern Russia	Size: 4–10 cm (2–4 in) long, plus 2–9 cm (1–4 in) tail Habitat: Shrubland Diet: Insects, worms, and other invertebrates, as well as small vertebrates, carrion, and plants	LC Unknown
Kashmir pygmy shrew	S. planiceps Miller, 1911	Northern India and Pakistan	Size: 4–10 cm (2–4 in) long, plus 2–9 cm (1–4 in) tail Habitat: Forest and rocky areas Diet: Insects, worms, and other invertebrates, as well as small vertebrates, carrion, and plants	LC Unknown
Kozlov's shrew	S. kozlovi Stroganov, 1952	South-central China	Size: 4–10 cm (2–4 in) long, plus 2–9 cm (1–4 in) tail Habitat: Unknown Diet: Insects, worms, and other invertebrates, as well as small vertebrates, carrion, and plants	DD Unknown
Large-toothed shrew	S. macrodon Merriam, 1895	Southern Mexico	Size: 4–10 cm (2–4 in) long, plus 2–9 cm (1–4 in) tail Habitat: Forest Diet: Insects, worms, and other invertebrates, as well as small vertebrates, carrion, and plants	NT Unknown
Laxmann's shrew	S. caecutiens Laxmann, 1788	Northern Europe and northern Asia	Size: 4–10 cm (2–4 in) long, plus 2–9 cm (1–4 in) tail Habitat: Forest, shrubland, and inland wetlands Diet: Insects and other invertebrates	LC Unknown
Lesser striped shrew	S. bedfordiae Thomas, 1911	Central China and southern Asia	Size: 4–10 cm (2–4 in) long, plus 2–9 cm (1–4 in) tail Habitat: Forest and grassland Diet: Insects	LC Unknown
Long-clawed shrew	S. unguiculatus Dobson, 1890	Eastern Asia	Size: 4–10 cm (2–4 in) long, plus 2–9 cm (1–4 in) tail Habitat: Forest and grassland Diet: Insects and other invertebrates	LC Unknown
Long-tailed shrew	S. dispar Batchelder, 1911	Eastern North America	Size: 4–10 cm (2–4 in) long, plus 2–9 cm (1–4 in) tail Habitat: Forest, inland wetlands, and rocky areas Diet: Small invertebrates and plants	LC Unknown
Maritime shrew	S. maritimensis Smith, 1939	Eastern Canada	Size: 4–10 cm (2–4 in) long, plus 2–9 cm (1–4 in) tail Habitat: Forest, inland wetlands, and unknown Diet: Insects, worms, and other invertebrates, as well as small vertebrates, carrion, and plants	LC Unknown
Marsh shrew	S. bendirii Merriam, 1884	Western North America	Size: 4–10 cm (2–4 in) long, plus 2–9 cm (1–4 in) tail Habitat: Forest and inland wetlands Diet: Insects	LC Unknown
Merriam's shrew	S. merriami Dobson, 1890	Western United States	Size: 5–7 cm (2–3 in) long, plus 3–5 cm (1–2 in) tail Habitat: Forest, shrubland, and grassland Diet: Insects and other invertebrates, as well as small vertebrates	LC Unknown
Mexican long-tailed shrew	S. oreopolus Merriam, 1892	Southern Mexico	Size: 4–10 cm (2–4 in) long, plus 2–9 cm (1–4 in) tail Habitat: Forest and grassland Diet: Insects, worms, and other invertebrates, as well as small vertebrates, carrion, and plants	LC Unknown
Montane shrew	S. monticolus Merriam, 1890	Western North America	Size: 6–8 cm (2–3 in) long, plus 4–7 cm (2–3 in) tail Habitat: Forest, grassland, and inland wetlands Diet: Insects and other invertebrates, as well as salamanders, seeds, lichen, and fungi	LC Unknown
Mount Lyell shrew	S. lyelli Merriam, 1902	Western United States	Size: 4–10 cm (2–4 in) long, plus 2–9 cm (1–4 in) tail Habitat: Shrubland, grassland, and inland wetlands Diet: Insects	LC Unknown
New Mexico shrew	S. neomexicanus Bailey, 1913	Southern United States	Size: 4–10 cm (2–4 in) long, plus 2–9 cm (1–4 in) tail Habitat: Forest and grassland Diet: Insects, worms, and other invertebrates, as well as small vertebrates, carrion, and plants	DD Unknown
Orizaba long-tailed shrew	S. orizabae Merriam, 1895	Central Mexico	Size: 4–10 cm (2–4 in) long, plus 2–9 cm (1–4 in) tail Habitat: Forest and grassland Diet: Insects, worms, and other invertebrates, as well as small vertebrates, carrion, and plants	LC Unknown
Ornate shrew	S. ornatus Merriam, 1895 Eight subspecies: S. o. juncensis (Tule shrew); S. o. lagunae; S. o. ornatus; S. o. relictus; S. o. salarius; S. o. salicornicus; S. o. willetti; S. o. sinuosus (Suisun shrew)	Western North America	Size: 4–10 cm (2–4 in) long, plus 2–9 cm (1–4 in) tail Habitat: Forest, shrubland, grassland, and inland wetlands Diet: Insects, worms, and other invertebrates, as well as small vertebrates, carrion, and plants	LC Unknown
Pacific shrew	S. pacificus Coues, 1877 Two subspecies: S. p. cascadensis; S. p. pacificus	Western United States	Size: 8–9 cm (3–4 in) long, plus 5–8 cm (2–3 in) tail Habitat: Forest Diet: Insects, other invertebrates, and amphibians, as well as plants and fungi	LC Unknown
Paramushir shrew	S. leucogaster Kuroda, 1933	Eastern Russia	Size: 4–10 cm (2–4 in) long, plus 2–9 cm (1–4 in) tail Habitat: Shrubland Diet: Insects, worms, and other invertebrates, as well as small vertebrates, carrion, and plants	DD Unknown
Portenko's shrew	S. portenkoi Stroganov, 1956	Eastern Russia	Size: 4–10 cm (2–4 in) long, plus 2–9 cm (1–4 in) tail Habitat: Grassland Diet: Insects, worms, and other invertebrates, as well as small vertebrates, carrion, and plants	DD Unknown
Prairie shrew	S. haydeni Baird, 1857	Central North America	Size: 4–10 cm (2–4 in) long, plus 2–9 cm (1–4 in) tail Habitat: Forest, shrubland, grassland, and inland wetlands Diet: Insects and other invertebrates, as well as small vertebrates and plants	LC Unknown
Preble's shrew	S. preblei Jackson, 1922	Northwestern United States	Size: 4–10 cm (2–4 in) long, plus 2–9 cm (1–4 in) tail Habitat: Forest, shrubland, grassland, inland wetlands, and desert Diet: Insects	LC Unknown
Pribilof Island shrew	S. pribilofensis Merriam, 1895	Pribilof Islands in Alaska	Size: 4–10 cm (2–4 in) long, plus 2–9 cm (1–4 in) tail Habitat: Grassland and coastal marine Diet: Insects, worms, and other invertebrates, as well as small vertebrates, carrion, and plants	EN Unknown
Radde's shrew	S. raddei Satunin, 1895	Western Asia	Size: 4–10 cm (2–4 in) long, plus 2–9 cm (1–4 in) tail Habitat: Forest and rocky areas Diet: Insects	LC Unknown
Saint Lawrence Island shrew	S. jacksoni Hall & Gilmore, 1932	St. Lawrence Island in Alaska	Size: 4–10 cm (2–4 in) long, plus 2–9 cm (1–4 in) tail Habitat: Grassland, inland wetlands, and rocky areas Diet: Insects	LC Unknown
San Cristobal shrew	S. stizodon Merriam, 1895	Southeastern Mexico	Size: 4–10 cm (2–4 in) long, plus 2–9 cm (1–4 in) tail Habitat: Forest Diet: Insects, worms, and other invertebrates, as well as small vertebrates, carrion, and plants	CR Unknown
Saussure's shrew	S. saussurei Merriam, 1892	Southern Mexico and Guatemala	Size: 4–10 cm (2–4 in) long, plus 2–9 cm (1–4 in) tail Habitat: Forest Diet: Insects, worms, and other invertebrates, as well as small vertebrates, carrion, and plants	LC Unknown
Sclater's shrew	S. sclateri Merriam, 1897	Southern Mexico and Guatemala	Size: 4–10 cm (2–4 in) long, plus 2–9 cm (1–4 in) tail Habitat: Forest Diet: Insects, worms, and other invertebrates, as well as small vertebrates, carrion, and plants	CR Unknown
Shinto shrew	S. shinto Thomas, 1905 Three subspecies: S. s. sadonis (Sado shrew); S. s. shikokensis; S. s. shinto	Japan	Size: 4–10 cm (2–4 in) long, plus 2–9 cm (1–4 in) tail Habitat: Forest and shrubland Diet: Insects, worms, and other invertebrates, as well as small vertebrates, carrion, and plants	LC Unknown
Siberian large-toothed shrew	S. daphaenodon Thomas, 1907	Northern Asia	Size: 4–10 cm (2–4 in) long, plus 2–9 cm (1–4 in) tail Habitat: Inland wetlands and forest Diet: Insects and other invertebrates	LC Unknown
Slender shrew	S. gracillimus Thomas, 1907 Four subspecies: S. g. gracillimus; S. g. granti; S. g. minor; S. g. natalae	Eastern Asia	Size: 4–10 cm (2–4 in) long, plus 2–9 cm (1–4 in) tail Habitat: Forest and grassland Diet: Invertebrates	LC Unknown
Smoky shrew	S. fumeus Miller, 1895	Eastern North America	Size: 4–10 cm (2–4 in) long, plus 2–9 cm (1–4 in) tail Habitat: Forest and shrubland Diet: Invertebrates, as well as salamanders and fungi	LC Unknown
Southeastern shrew	S. longirostris Bachman, 1837 Three subspecies: S. l. eonis; S. l. fisheri (Dismal Swamp southeastern shrew); S. l. longirostris	Eastern United States	Size: 4–6 cm (2–2 in) long, plus 2–4 cm (1–2 in) tail Habitat: Inland wetlands, grassland, shrubland, and forest Diet: Insects and other invertebrates as well as seeds	LC Unknown
Taiga shrew	S. isodon Turov, 1924	Northern Europe and northern Asia	Size: 4–10 cm (2–4 in) long, plus 2–9 cm (1–4 in) tail Habitat: Forest and shrubland Diet: Insects, worms, and other invertebrates, as well as small vertebrates, carrion, and plants	LC Unknown
Tibetan shrew	S. thibetanus Kaschtschenko, 1905	Central China	Size: 4–10 cm (2–4 in) long, plus 2–9 cm (1–4 in) tail Habitat: Forest, shrubland, and grassland Diet: Insects, worms, and other invertebrates, as well as small vertebrates, carrion, and plants	LC Unknown
Tien Shan shrew	S. asper Thomas, 1914	Central Asia	Size: 4–10 cm (2–4 in) long, plus 2–9 cm (1–4 in) tail Habitat: Forest and shrubland Diet: Insects and other invertebrates	LC Unknown
Trowbridge's shrew	S. trowbridgii Baird, 1857	Western North America	Size: 4–10 cm (2–4 in) long, plus 2–9 cm (1–4 in) tail Habitat: Forest, shrubland, and inland wetlands Diet: Insects and other invertebrates	LC Unknown
Tundra shrew	S. tundrensis Merriam, 1900	Asia and western North America	Size: 8–12 cm (3–5 in) long, plus 2–4 cm (1–2 in) tail Habitat: Forest, grassland, and inland wetlands Diet: Insects, other invertebrates, and flowers	LC Unknown
Ussuri shrew	S. mirabilis Ognew, 1937	Eastern Asia	Size: 4–10 cm (2–4 in) long, plus 2–9 cm (1–4 in) tail Habitat: Forest Diet: Insects, worms, and other invertebrates, as well as small vertebrates, carrion, and plants	DD Unknown
Vagrant shrew	S. vagrans Baird, 1857	Western North America	Size: 4–10 cm (2–4 in) long, plus 2–9 cm (1–4 in) tail Habitat: Forest and inland wetlands Diet: Insects and other invertebrates	LC Unknown
Valais shrew	S. antinorii Bonaparte, 1840	Southern Europe	Size: 4–10 cm (2–4 in) long, plus 2–9 cm (1–4 in) tail Habitat: Inland wetlands Diet: Insects, worms, and other invertebrates, as well as small vertebrates, carrion, and plants	LC Unknown
Veracruz shrew	S. veraecrucis Jackson, 1925	Mexico	Size: 4–10 cm (2–4 in) long, plus 2–9 cm (1–4 in) tail Habitat: Forest Diet: Insects, worms, and other invertebrates, as well as small vertebrates, carrion, and plants	LC Unknown
Verapaz shrew	S. veraepacis Alston, 1877 Three subspecies: S. v. chiapensis; S. v. mutabilis; S. v. veraepacis	Southern Mexico and Guatemala	Size: 4–10 cm (2–4 in) long, plus 2–9 cm (1–4 in) tail Habitat: Forest Diet: Insects, worms, and other invertebrates, as well as small vertebrates, carrion, and plants	LC Unknown
Zacatecas shrew	S. emarginatus Jackson, 1925	Central Mexico	Size: 4–10 cm (2–4 in) long, plus 2–9 cm (1–4 in) tail Habitat: Forest Diet: Insects, worms, and other invertebrates, as well as small vertebrates, carrion, and plants	LC Unknown

Genus Soriculus – Blyth, 1854 – one species
Common name	Scientific name and subspecies	Range	Size and ecology	IUCN status and estimated population
Himalayan shrew	S. nigrescens (Gray, 1842)	Himalayas in Asia	Size: 8–10 cm (3–4 in) long, plus 3–7 cm (1–3 in) tail Habitat: Forest, shrubland, and rocky areas Diet: Earthworms, insects, and other invertebrates, as well as small mammals	LC Unknown

== Sources ==
- Nowak, Ronald M. (1999). Walker's Mammals of the World. Vol. 1. Johns Hopkins University Press. ISBN 978-0-8018-5789-8.
- Hutterer, Rainer (2005). Wilson, Don E.; Reeder, DeeAnn M. (eds.). Mammal Species of the World. Vol. 1 (3rd ed.). Johns Hopkins University Press. ISBN 978-0-8018-8221-0.
