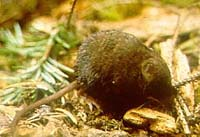
- Baird's shrew (Sorex bairdi)

Scientific classification
- Domain: Eukaryota
- Kingdom: Animalia
- Phylum: Chordata
- Class: Mammalia
- Order: Eulipotyphla
- Family: Soricidae
- Subfamily: Soricinae; Fischer von Waldheim, 1817

Tribes
- Anourosoricini; Blarinellini; Blarinini; Nectogalini; Notiosoricini; Soricini

= Red-toothed shrew =

Soricinae Temporal range: Early Oligocene to Recent

Subfamily of mammals

The red-toothed shrews of the subfamily Soricinae are one of three living subfamilies of shrews, along with Crocidurinae (white-toothed shrews) and Myosoricinae (African white-toothed shrews). In addition, the family contains the extinct subfamilies Limnoecinae, Crocidosoricinae, Allosoricinae and Heterosoricinae. These species are typically found in North America, northern South America, Europe and northern Asia. The enamel of the tips of their teeth is reddish due to iron pigment. The iron deposits serve to harden the enamel and are concentrated in those parts of the teeth most subject to wear. Members of the genera Chimarrogale, Nectogale, Neomys (Nectogalini) and some members of Sorex (Soricini) are known as water shrews, due to having a semi-aquatic lifestyle.

== Species ==
The list of species is:

- Tribe Anourosoricini
  - Genus Anourosorex (Asian mole shrews)
    - Assam mole shrew, A. assamensis
    - Giant mole shrew, A. schmidi
    - Chinese mole shrew, A. squamipes
    - Taiwanese mole shrew, A. yamashinai
- Tribe Blarinellini
  - Genus Blarinella (some Asiatic short-tailed shrews)
    - Asiatic short-tailed shrew, B. quadraticauda
    - Burmese short-tailed shrew, B. wardi
  - Genus Parablarinella (some Asiatic short-tailed shrews)
    - Indochinese short-tailed shrew, P. griselda
    - Anhui short-tailed shrew, P. latimaxillata
- Tribe Blarinini
  - Genus Blarina (American short-tailed shrews)
    - Northern short-tailed shrew, B. brevicauda
    - Southern short-tailed shrew, B. carolinensis
    - Elliot's short-tailed shrew, B. hylophaga
    - Everglades short-tailed shrew, B. peninsulae
  - Genus Cryptotis (small-eared shrews)
    - Cryptotis mexicana group
      - Mexican small-eared shrew, C. mexicana
      - Nelson's small-eared shrew, C. nelsoni
      - Grizzled Mexican small-eared shrew, C. obscura
      - Phillips's small-eared shrew, C. phillipsii
      - Cryptotis goldmani set
        - Central Mexican broad-clawed shrew, C. alticola
        - Goldman's broad-clawed shrew, C. goldmani
        - Goodwin's broad-clawed shrew, C. goodwini
        - Guatemalan broad-clawed shrew, C. griseoventris
        - C. lacertosus
        - C. mam
        - Oaxacan broad-clawed shrew, C. peregrina
    - Cryptotis nigrescens group
      - Eastern Cordillera small-footed shrew, C. brachyonyx
      - Colombian small-eared shrew, C. colombiana
      - Honduran small-eared shrew, C. hondurensis
      - Yucatan small-eared shrew, C. mayensis
      - Darién small-eared shrew, C. mera
      - Merriam's small-eared shrew, C. merriami
      - Blackish small-eared shrew, C. nigrescens
    - Cryptotis thomasi group
      - Ecuadoran small-eared shrew, C. equatoris
      - Medellín small-eared shrew, C. medellinia
      - Merida small-eared shrew, C. meridensis
      - Wandering small-eared shrew, C. montivaga
      - Peruvian small-eared shrew, C. peruviensis
      - Scaly-footed small-eared shrew or Western Colombian small-eared shrew, C. squamipes
      - Tamá small-eared shrew, C. tamensis
      - Thomas's small-eared shrew, C. thomasi
    - Cryptotis parva group
      - Central American least shrew, C. orophila
      - North American least shrew, C. parva
      - Tropical small-eared shrew, C. tropicalis
    - ungrouped/relict
      - Enders's small-eared shrew, C. endersi
      - Talamancan small-eared shrew, C. gracilis
      - Big Mexican small-eared shrew, C. magna

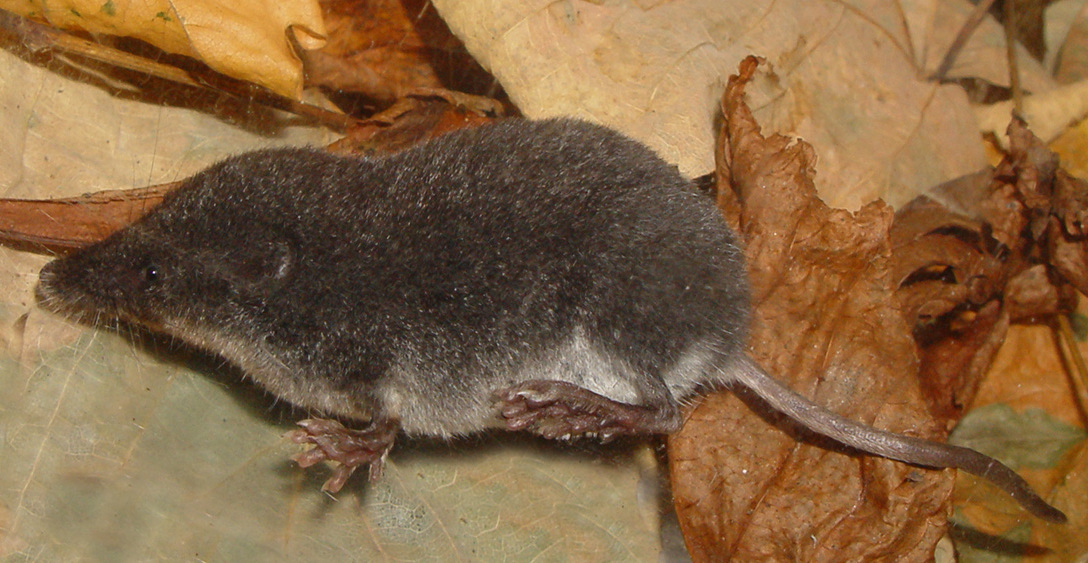
Southern water shrew (Neomys anomalus)

- Tribe Nectogalini
  - Genus Chimarrogale (Asiatic water shrews)
    - Malayan water shrew, C. hantu
    - Himalayan water shrew, C. himalayica
    - Bornean water shrew, C. phaeura
    - Japanese water shrew, C. platycephalus
    - Chinese water shrew, C. styani
    - Sumatran water shrew, C. sumatrana
  - Genus Chodsigoa
    - Van Sung's shrew, C. cauvansunga
    - Chodsigoa furva (Anthony, 1941)
    - Chodsigoa hoffmanni Zhong-Zheng Chen et al., 2017
    - De Winton's shrew, C. hypsibia
    - Lamulate shrew, C. lamula (Soriculus lamula)
    - Lowe's shrew, C. parca
    - Pygmy brown-toothed shrew, C. parva
    - Salenski's shrew, C. salenskii
    - Smith's shrew, C. smithii
    - Lesser Taiwanese shrew, C. sodalis
  - Genus Episoriculus
    - Hodgsons's brown-toothed shrew, E. caudatus
    - Taiwanese brown-toothed shrew, E. fumidus
    - Long-tailed brown-toothed shrew, E. leucops
    - Long-tailed mountain shrew, E. macrurus
  - Genus Nectogale
    - Elegant water shrew, N. elegans
  - Genus Neomys (Eurasian water shrews)
    - Mediterranean water shrew, N. anomalus
    - Eurasian water shrew, N. fodiens
    - Transcaucasian water shrew, N. teres
  - Genus †Nesiotites
    - Balearic shrew, †N. hidalgo (Extinct c. 2000 BC)
  - Genus †Asoriculus
    - Sardinian shrew, †A. similis (Extinct: Holocene)
  - Genus Soriculus
    - Himalayan shrew, S. nigrescens
- Tribe Notiosoricini
  - Genus Megasorex
    - Mexican shrew, M. gigas
  - Genus Notiosorex
    - Cockrum's gray shrew, N. cockrumi
    - Crawford's gray shrew, N. crawfordi
    - Large-eared gray shrew, N. evotis
    - Villa's gray shrew, N. villai
    - †N. repenningi
    - †N. jacksoni
    - †N. harrisi
    - †N. dalquesti
- Tribe Soricini
  - Genus Sorex (long-tailed shrews)
    - Subgenus Otisorex
      - Long-tailed shrew, Sorex dispar
      - Smoky shrew, Sorex fumeus
      - American pygmy shrew, Sorex hoyi
      - Large-toothed shrew, Sorex macrodon
      - Carmen Mountain shrew, Sorex milleri
      - Dwarf shrew, Sorex nanus
      - Mexican long-tailed shrew, Sorex oreopolus
      - Orizaba long-tailed shrew, Sorex orizabae
      - Ornate shrew, Sorex ornatus
      - Inyo shrew, Sorex tenellus
      - Verapaz shrew, Sorex veraepacis
      - Sorex ixtlanensis (Carraway, 2007)
      - Sorex vagrans complex
        - Glacier Bay water shrew, Sorex alaskanus
        - Baird's shrew, Sorex bairdii
        - Marsh shrew, Sorex bendirii
        - Montane shrew, Sorex monticolus
        - New Mexico shrew, Sorex neomexicanus
        - Pacific shrew, Sorex pacificus
        - American water shrew, Sorex palustris
        - Fog shrew, Sorex sonomae
        - Vagrant shrew, Sorex vagrans
      - Sorex cinereus group
        - Kamchatka shrew, Sorex camtschatica
        - Cinereus shrew, Sorex cinereus
        - Prairie shrew, Sorex haydeni
        - Saint Lawrence Island shrew, Sorex jacksoni
        - Paramushir shrew, Sorex leucogaster
        - Southeastern shrew, Sorex longirostris
        - Mount Lyell shrew, Sorex lyelli
        - Portenko's shrew, Sorex portenkoi
        - Preble's shrew, Sorex preblei
        - Pribilof Island shrew, Sorex pribilofensis
        - Olympic shrew, Sorex rohweri
        - Barren ground shrew, Sorex ugyunak
    - Subgenus Sorex
      - Dneper common shrew, Sorex averini
      - Lesser striped shrew, Sorex bedfordiae
      - Stripe-backed shrew, Sorex cylindricauda
      - Chinese highland shrew, Sorex excelsus
      - Azumi shrew, Sorex hosonoi
      - Chinese shrew, Sorex sinalis
      - Alaska tiny shrew, Sorex yukonicus
      - Sorex alpinus group
        - Alpine shrew, Sorex alpinus
        - Ussuri shrew, Sorex mirabilis
      - Sorex araneus group
        - Valais shrew, Sorex antinorii
        - Common shrew, Sorex araneus
        - Udine shrew, Sorex arunchi
        - Millet's shrew, Sorex coronatus
        - Siberian large-toothed shrew, Sorex daphaenodon
        - Iberian shrew, Sorex granarius
        - Caucasian shrew, Sorex satunini
      - Sorex arcticus group
        - Arctic shrew, Sorex arcticus
        - Maritime shrew, Sorex maritimensis
      - Sorex tundrensis group
        - Tien Shan shrew, Sorex asper
        - Gansu shrew, Sorex cansulus
        - Tundra shrew, Sorex tundrensis
      - Sorex minutus group
        - Buchara shrew, Sorex buchariensis
        - Kozlov's shrew, Sorex kozlovi
        - Caucasian pygmy shrew, Sorex volnuchini
      - Sorex caecutiens group
        - Laxmann's shrew, Sorex caecutiens
        - Taiga shrew, Sorex isodon
        - Eurasian least shrew, Sorex minutissimus
        - Eurasian pygmy shrew, Sorex minutus
        - Flat-skulled shrew, Sorex roboratus
        - Shinto shrew, Sorex shinto
        - Long-clawed shrew, Sorex unguiculatus
      - Sorex gracillimus group
        - Slender shrew, Sorex gracillimus
      - Sorex raddei group
        - Radde's shrew, Sorex raddei
      - Sorex samniticus group
        - Apennine shrew, Sorex samniticus
    - Subgenus incertae sedis
      - Arizona shrew, Sorex arizonae
      - Zacatecas shrew, Sorex emarginatus
      - Merriam's shrew, Sorex merriami
      - Kashmir pygmy shrew, Sorex planiceps
      - Saussure's shrew, Sorex saussurei
      - Sorex mediopua (Carraway, 2007)
      - Sclater's shrew, Sorex sclateri
      - San Cristobal shrew, Sorex stizodon
      - Tibetan shrew, Sorex thibetanus
      - Trowbridge's shrew, Sorex trowbridgii
      - Chestnut-bellied shrew, Sorex ventralis
      - Veracruz shrew, Sorex veraecrucis
