= C. tropicalis =

C. tropicalis may refer to:

- Caenorhabditis tropicalis, a species of nematodes
- Candida tropicalis, a yeast species
- Cryptotis tropicalis, the tropical small-eared shrew, a very small mammal species found in Mexico, Belize and Guatemala
