= Tamá small-eared shrew =

Conservation status
- Least Concern (IUCN 3.1)

Scientific classification
- Kingdom: Animalia
- Phylum: Chordata
- Class: Mammalia
- Order: Eulipotyphla
- Family: Soricidae
- Genus: Cryptotis
- Species: C. tamensis

Binomial name
- Cryptotis tamensis Woodman, 2002
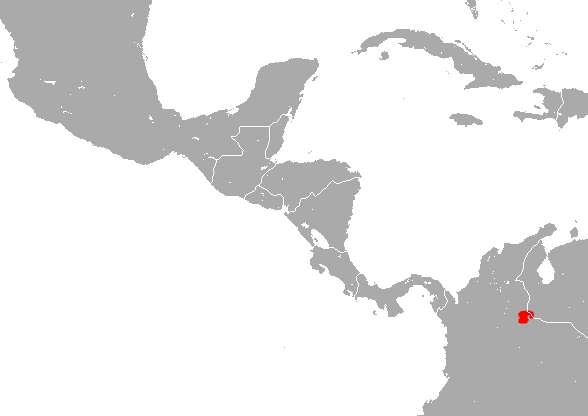
- Tamá small-eared shrew range

Species of mammal

The Tamá small-eared shrew (Cryptotis tamensis) is a species of mammal in the family Soricidae. It is known from the Cordillera Oriental of Colombia and the Páramo de Tamá of western Venezuela, where it has been found primarily in cloud forest at elevations between 2,380 and 3,330 m (7,810 and 10,930 ft). Its range includes Venezuela's El Tamá National Park. The closest relatives of the species are C. meridensis and C. thomasi.
