= Southern Colombian small-eared shrew =

Scientific classification
- Kingdom: Animalia
- Phylum: Chordata
- Class: Mammalia
- Order: Eulipotyphla
- Family: Soricidae
- Genus: Cryptotis
- Species: C. andinus

Binomial name
- Cryptotis andinus Woodman, 2023

Species of mammal

The southern Colombian small-eared shrew (Cryptotis andinus) is a species of small-eared shrew native to Colombia.

== See also ==
- List of living mammal species described in the 2020s
