= Cheng Huang =

Cheng Huang may refer to:

- City God (China), deities in Chinese mythology
- Huang Cheng (born 1982), Chinese Paralympic rower
