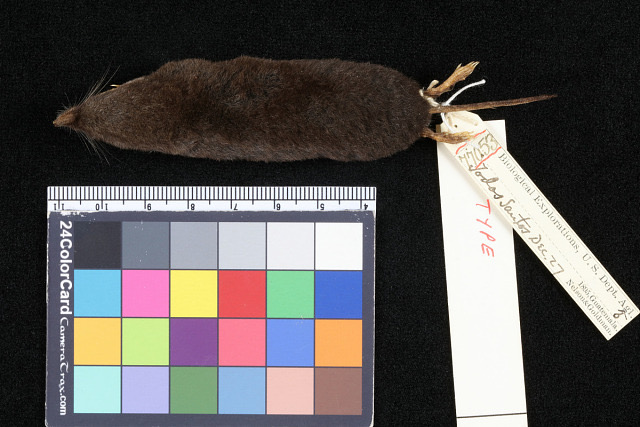

Conservation status
- Data Deficient (IUCN 3.1)

Scientific classification
- Kingdom: Animalia
- Phylum: Chordata
- Class: Mammalia
- Order: Eulipotyphla
- Family: Soricidae
- Genus: Cryptotis
- Species: C. mam

Binomial name
- Cryptotis mam Woodman, 2010

= Cryptotis mam =

Species of mammal

Cryptotis mam is a species of mammal in the family Soricidae. It is endemic to Guatemala.
