= Guatemalan broad-clawed shrew =

Conservation status
- Endangered (IUCN 3.1)

Scientific classification
- Kingdom: Animalia
- Phylum: Chordata
- Class: Mammalia
- Order: Eulipotyphla
- Family: Soricidae
- Genus: Cryptotis
- Species: C. griseoventris

Binomial name
- Cryptotis griseoventris Jackson, 1933
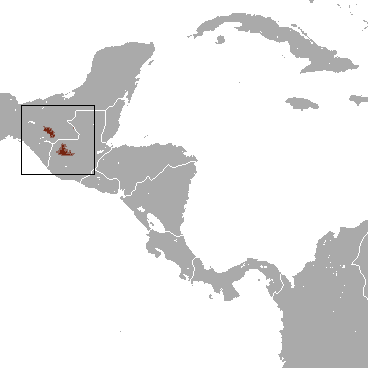
- Guatemalan broad-clawed shrew range

Species of mammal

The Guatemalan broad-clawed shrew (Cryptotis griseoventris) is a species of small-eared shrew in the family Soricidae. It is known from Guatemala and the Mexican state of Chiapas, where it has been found in montane forests of oak, pine and fir, as well as secondary forest, at elevations above 2,100 m (6,900 ft). It feeds on insects. Deforestation and habitat fragmentation are major threats, particularly in Chiapas. It was formerly considered conspecific with C. goldmani.

== Description ==
The Guatemalan shrew has a dark-gray pelage with its underside being a rich, lead-like gray color.
