= Yalijux shrew =

Conservation status
- Data Deficient (IUCN 3.1)

Scientific classification
- Kingdom: Animalia
- Phylum: Chordata
- Class: Mammalia
- Order: Eulipotyphla
- Family: Soricidae
- Genus: Cryptotis
- Species: C. oreoryctes

Binomial name
- Cryptotis oreoryctes Woodman, 2011

Species of mammal

The Yalijux shrew (Cryptotis oreoryctes) is a species of mammal in the family Soricidae. It is endemic to Guatemala.
