= Cryptotis aroensis =

Conservation status
- Endangered (IUCN 3.1)

Scientific classification
- Kingdom: Animalia
- Phylum: Chordata
- Class: Mammalia
- Order: Eulipotyphla
- Family: Soricidae
- Genus: Cryptotis
- Species: C. aroensis

Binomial name
- Cryptotis aroensis Quiroga-Carmona & Molinari, 2012

Species of mammal

Cryptotis aroensis is a species of mammal in the family Soricidae. It is endemic to Venezuela.
