= Chodsigoa hoffmanni =

Conservation status
- Least Concern (IUCN 3.1)

Scientific classification
- Kingdom: Animalia
- Phylum: Chordata
- Class: Mammalia
- Order: Eulipotyphla
- Family: Soricidae
- Genus: Chodsigoa
- Species: C. hoffmanni

Binomial name
- Chodsigoa hoffmanni Chen Zhongzheng, He Kai, Huang Cheng, Wan Tao, Lin Liangkong, S. Liu, & Jiang Xuelong, 2017

Species of mammal

Chodsigoa hoffmanni, Hoffmann's long-tailed shrew, is a species of red-toothed shrew. It is native to China and Vietnam.
