= Merriam's small-eared shrew =

Conservation status
- Least Concern (IUCN 3.1)

Scientific classification
- Kingdom: Animalia
- Phylum: Chordata
- Class: Mammalia
- Order: Eulipotyphla
- Family: Soricidae
- Genus: Cryptotis
- Species: C. merriami

Binomial name
- Cryptotis merriami Choate, 1970
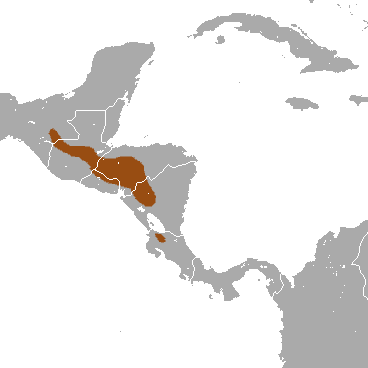

Species of mammal

Merriam's small-eared shrew (Cryptotis merriami) is a species of mammal in the family Soricidae. It is found in Chiapas, Guatemala, El Salvador, Honduras, Nicaragua and Costa Rica.
