= Wandering small-eared shrew =

Conservation status
- Least Concern (IUCN 3.1)

Scientific classification
- Kingdom: Animalia
- Phylum: Chordata
- Class: Mammalia
- Order: Eulipotyphla
- Family: Soricidae
- Genus: Cryptotis
- Species: C. montivaga

Binomial name
- Cryptotis montivaga (Anthony, 1921)
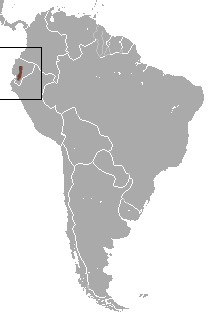
- Wandering small-eared shrew range

Species of mammal

The wandering small-eared shrew (Cryptotis montivaga) is a species of shrew in the family Soricidae. It is endemic to Ecuador.
