= Oaxacan broad-clawed shrew =

Conservation status
- Data Deficient (IUCN 3.1)

Scientific classification
- Kingdom: Animalia
- Phylum: Chordata
- Class: Mammalia
- Order: Eulipotyphla
- Family: Soricidae
- Genus: Cryptotis
- Species: C. peregrina

Binomial name
- Cryptotis peregrina (Merriam, 1895)

Species of mammal

The Oaxacan broad-clawed shrew (Cryptotis peregrina) is a species of mammal in the family Soricidae. It is found in the Mexican state of Oaxaca.
