= Yucatan small-eared shrew =

Conservation status
- Least Concern (IUCN 3.1)

Scientific classification
- Kingdom: Animalia
- Phylum: Chordata
- Class: Mammalia
- Order: Eulipotyphla
- Family: Soricidae
- Genus: Cryptotis
- Species: C. mayensis

Binomial name
- Cryptotis mayensis (Merriam, 1901)
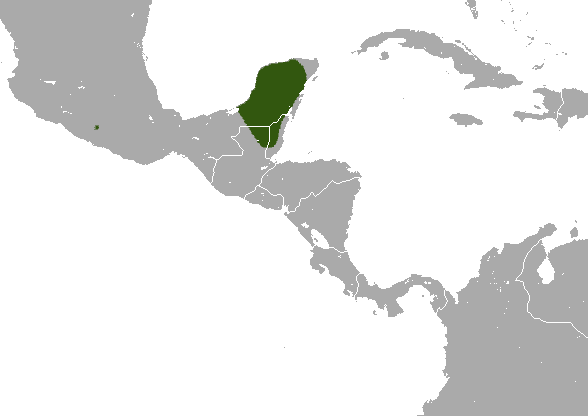
- Yucatan small-eared shrew range

Species of mammal

The Yucatan small-eared shrew (Cryptotis mayensis) is a species of mammal in the family Soricidae. It is mainly known from lowlands of Guatemala, Belize and Mexico's Yucatán Peninsula, where it has been found in dry scrubland and tropical dry forest at elevations below 100 m. It is threatened by deforestation.
