= Peruvian small-eared shrew =

Conservation status
- Data Deficient (IUCN 3.1)

Scientific classification
- Kingdom: Animalia
- Phylum: Chordata
- Class: Mammalia
- Order: Eulipotyphla
- Family: Soricidae
- Genus: Cryptotis
- Species: C. peruviensis

Binomial name
- Cryptotis peruviensis Vivar, Pacheco & Valqui, 1997
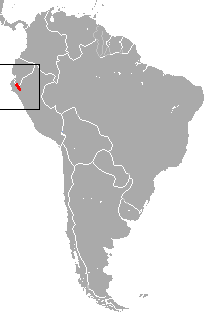
- Peruvian small-eared shrew range

Species of mammal

The Peruvian small-eared shrew (Cryptotis peruviensis) is a species of mammal in the family Soricidae. It is known only from northern Peru, where it has been found in shrubby "elfin" cloud forest in the Andes at elevations from 2,050 to 3,150 m (6,730 to 10,330 ft). The species may also be present in Ecuador. It has the southernmost range of any shrew in South America. (The restricted range of shrews in South America is a reflection of their limited mobility and relatively recent arrival from Central America as part of the Great American Interchange.)
