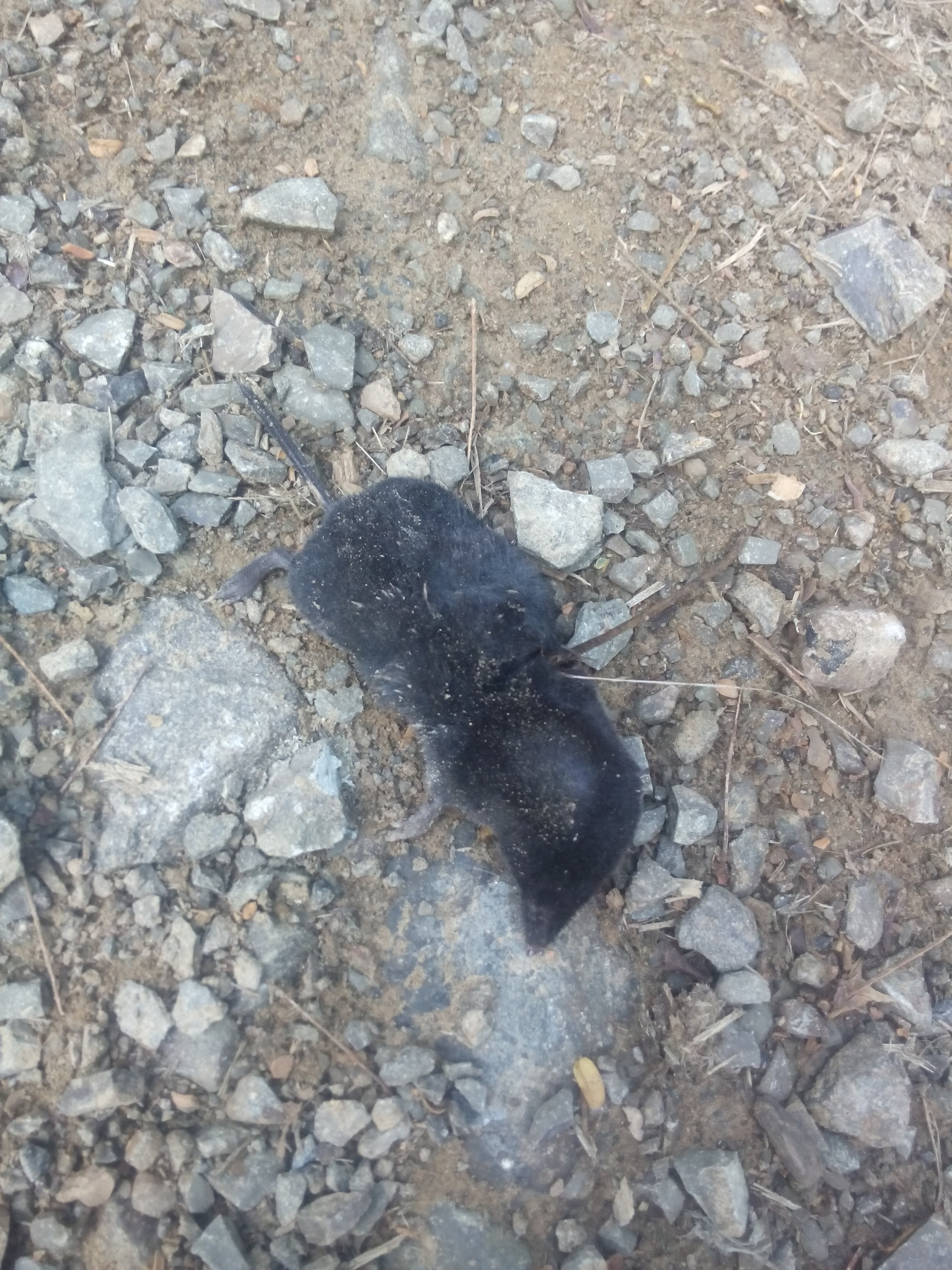

Conservation status
- Least Concern (IUCN 3.1)

Scientific classification
- Kingdom: Animalia
- Phylum: Chordata
- Class: Mammalia
- Order: Eulipotyphla
- Family: Soricidae
- Genus: Cryptotis
- Species: C. medellinia

Binomial name
- Cryptotis medellinia Thomas, 1921
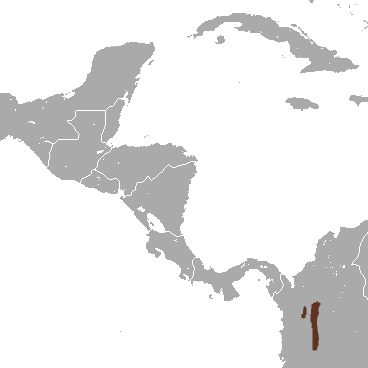
- Medellin small-eared shrew range

= Medellín small-eared shrew =

Species of mammal

The Medellín small-eared shrew (Cryptotis medellinia) is a species of mammal in the family Soricidae. It is endemic to Colombia, where it is known from the northern parts of the Cordillera Occidental and Cordillera Central at elevations from 2,500 to 2,800 m (8,200 to 9,200 ft). The species is found in montane forest and cultivated areas, and is subject to predation from the crab-eating fox. The specific name refers to the city of Medellín.
