= Talamancan small-eared shrew =

Conservation status
- Least Concern (IUCN 3.1)

Scientific classification
- Kingdom: Animalia
- Phylum: Chordata
- Class: Mammalia
- Order: Eulipotyphla
- Family: Soricidae
- Genus: Cryptotis
- Species: C. gracilis

Binomial name
- Cryptotis gracilis Miller, 1911
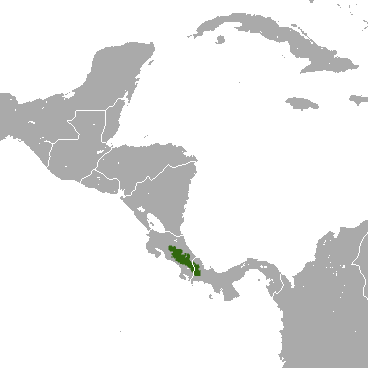
- Talamancan small-eared shrew range

Species of mammal

The Talamancan small-eared shrew (Cryptotis gracilis) is a species of mammal in the family Soricidae. It is found in Costa Rica and Panama.
