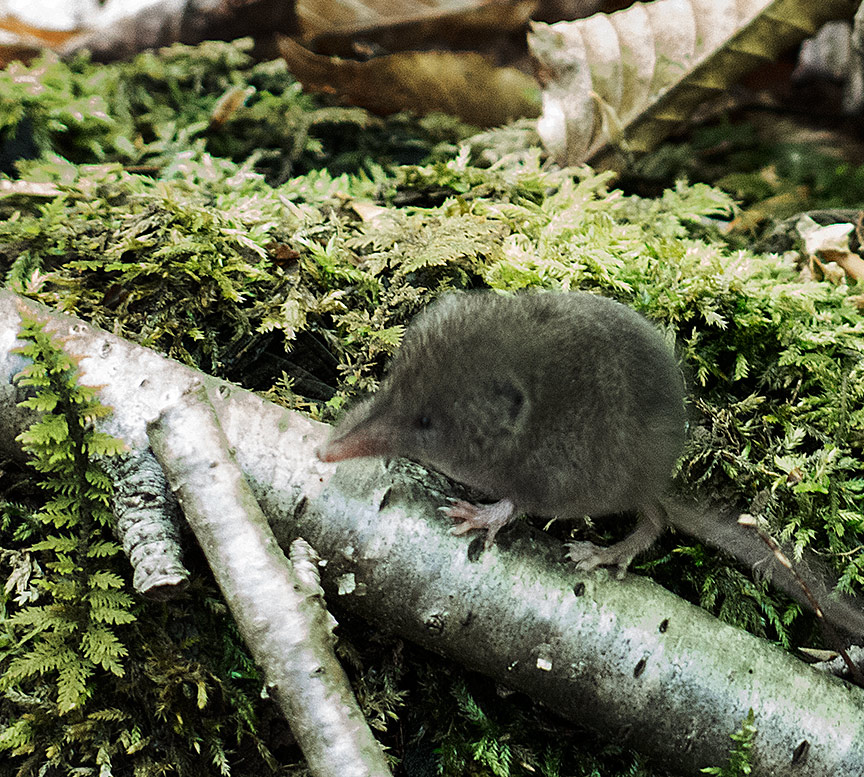
- North American least shrew (Cryptotis parva)

Scientific classification
- Kingdom: Animalia
- Phylum: Chordata
- Class: Mammalia
- Order: Eulipotyphla
- Family: Soricidae
- Subfamily: Soricinae
- Tribe: Blarinini
- Genus: Cryptotis; Pomel, 1848

Type species
- Sorex cinereus

Species
- See text

= Cryptotis =

Small-eared shrews Temporal range: Late Miocene to Recent

Genus of mammals

The genus Cryptotis is a group of relatively small shrews with short ears, which are usually not visible, and short tails, commonly called small-eared shrews. They have 30 teeth and are members of the red-toothed shrew subfamily. Since 1992, Neal Woodman (in cooperation with Robert Timm) at the United States National Museum has been in the process of revising the genus. To date, this has resulted in an increase in the number of species from 12 to 30.

Members of the genus are found mainly in Central America; the North American least shrew, C. parva, is the only species found north of Mexico. The genus occurs as far south as northern Peru and as far east as western Venezuela in South America. It is the only soricomorph genus found south of Guatemala. The limited diversity and restricted northern distribution of shrews in South America implies that the group entered the continent relatively recently from Central America, where they are more diverse, presumably as part of the Great American Interchange. However, shrews have no fossil record in South America that would allow their arrival to be dated.

== List of species ==
- Genus Cryptotis
  - C. mexicana group
    - Mexican small-eared shrew (Cryptotis mexicana)
    - Nelson's small-eared shrew (Cryptotis nelsoni)
    - Grizzled small-eared shrew (Cryptotis obscura)
    - Phillips's small-eared shrew (Cryptotis phillipsii)
  - C. goldmani group
    - Central Mexican broad-clawed shrew (Cryptotis alticola)
    - Goldman's broad-clawed shrew (Cryptotis goldmani)
    - Goodwin's broad-clawed shrew (Cryptotis goodwini)
    - Guatemalan broad-clawed shrew (Cryptotis griseoventris)
    - Cryptotis lacertosus
    - Cryptotis mam
    - Yalijux shrew (Cryptotis oreoryctes)
    - Oaxacan broad-clawed shrew (Cryptotis peregrina)
  - C. nigrescens group
    - Eastern Cordillera small-footed shrew (Cryptotis brachyonyx)
    - Colombian small-eared shrew (Cryptotis colombiana)
    - Honduran small-eared shrew (Cryptotis hondurensis)
    - Yucatan small-eared shrew (Cryptotis mayensis)
    - Darién small-eared shrew (Cryptotis mera)
    - Merriam's small-eared shrew (Cryptotis merriami)
    - Blackish small-eared shrew (Cryptotis nigrescens)
  - C. thomasi group
    - Southern Colombian small-eared shrew (Cryptotis andinus)
    - Cryptotis aroensis
    - Ecuadorean small-eared shrew (Cryptotis equatoris)
    - Rainer's small-eared shrew (Cryptotis huttereri)
    - Medellín small-eared shrew (Cryptotis medellinia)
    - Merida small-eared shrew (Cryptotis meridensis)
    - Wandering small-eared shrew (Cryptotis montivaga)
    - Peruvian small-eared shrew (Cryptotis peruviensis)
    - Scaly-footed small-eared shrew (Cryptotis squamipes)
    - Tamá small-eared shrew (Cryptotis tamensis)
    - Thomas's small-eared shrew (Cryptotis thomasi)
  - C. parva group
    - Central American least shrew (Cryptotis orophila)
    - North American least shrew (Cryptotis parva)
    - Tropical small-eared shrew (Cryptotis tropicalis)
  - ungrouped/relict
    - Enders's small-eared shrew (Cryptotis endersi)
    - Talamancan small-eared shrew (Cryptotis gracilis)
    - Big Mexican small-eared shrew (Cryptotis magna)
