= Central Mexican broad-clawed shrew =

Conservation status
- Near Threatened (IUCN 3.1)

Scientific classification
- Kingdom: Animalia
- Phylum: Chordata
- Class: Mammalia
- Order: Eulipotyphla
- Family: Soricidae
- Genus: Cryptotis
- Species: C. alticola

Binomial name
- Cryptotis alticola (Merriam, 1895)
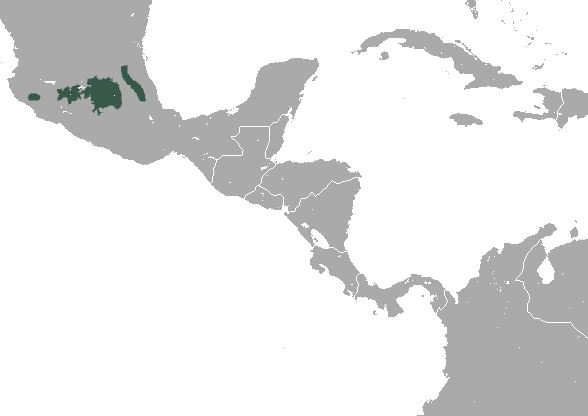
- Central Mexican broad-clawed shrew range

Species of mammal

The Central Mexican broad-clawed shrew (Cryptotis alticola) is a species of mammal in the family Soricidae. It is found in the highlands above 2000 m in the Mexican states of Colima, Hidalgo, Jalisco, Michoacán, Mexico, Morelos, and Puebla, and in Mexico City.

Type locality: Mexico, Volcán Popocatépetl, 11,500 ft. (3505 m).
