= Big Mexican small-eared shrew =

Conservation status
- Vulnerable (IUCN 3.1)

Scientific classification
- Kingdom: Animalia
- Phylum: Chordata
- Class: Mammalia
- Order: Eulipotyphla
- Family: Soricidae
- Genus: Cryptotis
- Species: C. magna

Binomial name
- Cryptotis magna (Merriam, 1895)
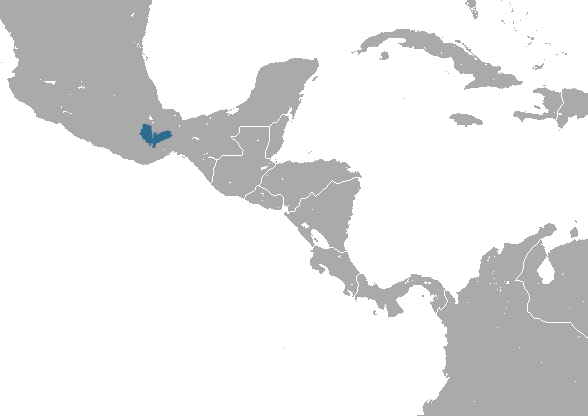
- Big Mexican small-eared shrew range

Species of mammal

The big Mexican small-eared shrew (Cryptotis magna) is a species of mammal in the family Soricidae. It is endemic to Mexico.
