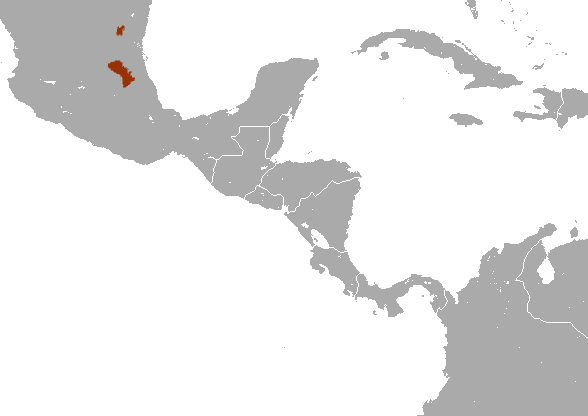
- Location of the Grizzled Small-eared Shrew

Conservation status
- Least Concern (IUCN 3.1)

Scientific classification
- Kingdom: Animalia
- Phylum: Chordata
- Class: Mammalia
- Order: Eulipotyphla
- Family: Soricidae
- Genus: Cryptotis
- Species: C. obscura

Binomial name
- Cryptotis obscura (Merriam), 1895

= Grizzled Mexican small-eared shrew =

Species of mammal

The grizzled Mexican small-eared shrew (Cryptotis obscura) is a small mammal in the order Eulipotyphla. It is native to the Sierra Madre Oriental of eastern Mexico. It can be found in dense, wet cloud forest, where it is found in the thick herbaceous undergrowth and leaf litter. It is known to be insectivorous and terrestrial. Threats to the species are deforestation for agriculture and urban development.
