= Tropical small-eared shrew =

Conservation status
- Near Threatened (IUCN 3.1)

Scientific classification
- Kingdom: Animalia
- Phylum: Chordata
- Class: Mammalia
- Order: Eulipotyphla
- Family: Soricidae
- Genus: Cryptotis
- Species: C. tropicalis

Binomial name
- Cryptotis tropicalis (Merriam, 1895)
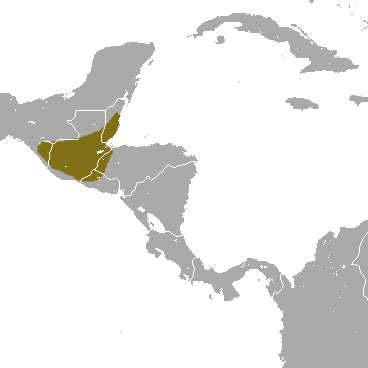
- Tropical small-eared shrew range

Synonyms
- micrurus (Tomes, 1861); tropicalis (Gray, 1843)

Species of mammal

The tropical small-eared shrew (Cryptotis tropicalis) is a very small mammal of the family Soricidae. The species is found in the eastern highlands of the Mexican state of Chiapas and parts of Belize and Guatemala. Until recently, it was considered a subspecies of the North American least shrew (C. parva), but it has gained species status. Its relationship with the Central American least shrew (C. orophila) remains to be studied.
