= Ecuadorian small-eared shrew =

Conservation status
- Least Concern (IUCN 3.1)

Scientific classification
- Kingdom: Animalia
- Phylum: Chordata
- Class: Mammalia
- Order: Eulipotyphla
- Family: Soricidae
- Genus: Cryptotis
- Species: C. equatoris

Binomial name
- Cryptotis equatoris Thomas, 1912
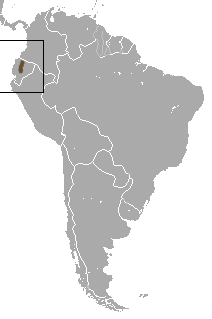
- Ecuadorian small-eared shrew range

Species of mammal

The Ecuadorian small-eared shrew (Cryptotis equatoris) is a species of shrew in the family Soricidae. It is found on the western and eastern slopes of the Andes in central Ecuador.
