= Mexican small-eared shrew =

Conservation status
- Least Concern (IUCN 3.1)

Scientific classification
- Kingdom: Animalia
- Phylum: Chordata
- Class: Mammalia
- Order: Eulipotyphla
- Family: Soricidae
- Genus: Cryptotis
- Species: C. mexicana

Binomial name
- Cryptotis mexicana (Coues, 1877)
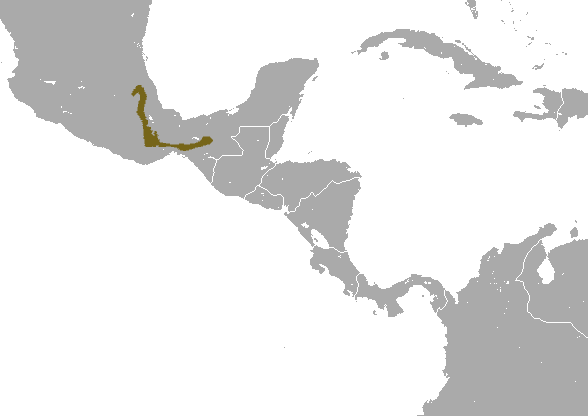
- Mexican small-eared shrew range

Species of mammal

The Mexican small-eared shrew (Cryptotis mexicana) is a species of mammal in the family Soricidae. It is endemic to Mexico.
