= Scaly-footed small-eared shrew =

Conservation status
- Least Concern (IUCN 3.1)

Scientific classification
- Kingdom: Animalia
- Phylum: Chordata
- Class: Mammalia
- Order: Eulipotyphla
- Family: Soricidae
- Genus: Cryptotis
- Species: C. squamipes

Binomial name
- Cryptotis squamipes (J. A. Allen, 1912)
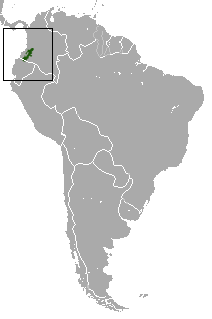
- Scaly-footed small-eared shrew range

Species of mammal

The scaly-footed small-eared shrew (Cryptotis squamipes) is a species of mammal in the family Soricidae. It is found in Colombia and Ecuador.
