= Phillips's small-eared shrew =

Conservation status
- Vulnerable (IUCN 3.1)

Scientific classification
- Kingdom: Animalia
- Phylum: Chordata
- Class: Mammalia
- Order: Eulipotyphla
- Family: Soricidae
- Genus: Cryptotis
- Species: C. phillipsii

Binomial name
- Cryptotis phillipsii (Schaldach, 1966)

Synonyms
- Notiosorex phillipsi

Species of mammal

Phillips' small-eared shrew or Phillips' short-eared shrew (Cryptotis phillipsii) is a species of mammal in the family Soricidae found in Mexico.
