= Thomas's small-eared shrew =

Conservation status
- Least Concern (IUCN 3.1)

Scientific classification
- Kingdom: Animalia
- Phylum: Chordata
- Class: Mammalia
- Order: Eulipotyphla
- Family: Soricidae
- Genus: Cryptotis
- Species: C. thomasi

Binomial name
- Cryptotis thomasi (Merriam, 1897)
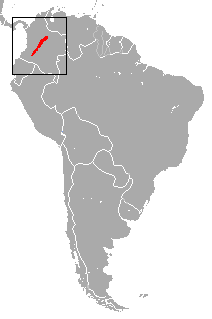
- Thomas's small-eared shrew range

Synonyms
- Cryptotis avia G.M. Allen, 1923

Species of mammal

Thomas's small-eared shrew (Cryptotis thomasi) is a species of mammal in the family Soricidae. It is endemic to Colombia.
