= Blackish small-eared shrew =

Conservation status
- Least Concern (IUCN 3.1)

Scientific classification
- Kingdom: Animalia
- Phylum: Chordata
- Class: Mammalia
- Order: Eulipotyphla
- Family: Soricidae
- Genus: Cryptotis
- Species: C. nigrescens

Binomial name
- Cryptotis nigrescens (J. A. Allen, 1895)
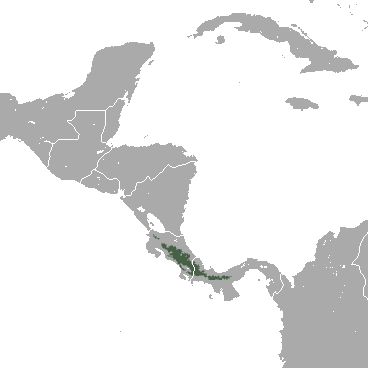
- Blackish small-eared shrew range

Species of mammal

The blackish small-eared shrew (Cryptotis nigrescens) is a species of shrew in the family Soricidae. It is found in parts of Costa Rica, El Salvador, Guatemala, Honduras, Mexico, and Panama. An example specific habitat is the Petenes mangroves of the Yucatán.
