= Merida small-eared shrew =

Conservation status
- Vulnerable (IUCN 3.1)

Scientific classification
- Kingdom: Animalia
- Phylum: Chordata
- Class: Mammalia
- Order: Eulipotyphla
- Family: Soricidae
- Genus: Cryptotis
- Species: C. meridensis

Binomial name
- Cryptotis meridensis Thomas, 1898
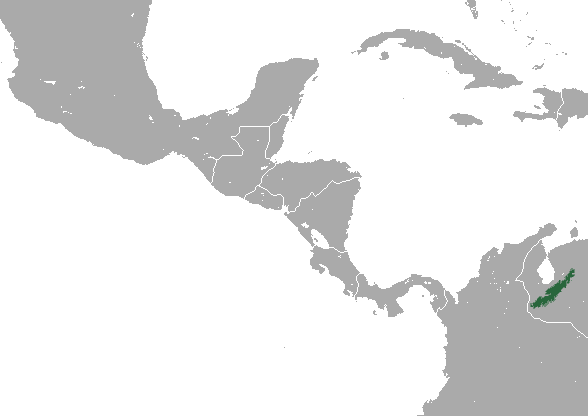
- Range of the Merida small-eared shrew

Species of mammal

The Merida small-eared shrew (Cryptotis meridensis) is a species of shrew that is endemic to Venezuela.

== Description ==
C. meridensis is one of the largest small-eared shrews, with a head-body length of 7 to 10 cm (2.8 to 3.9 in) and a tail 2.5 to 4.0 cm (0.98 to 1.57 in) long. Males and females are of similar size, with adults weighing between 9 and 18 grams (0.32 and 0.63 oz). The fur is long, and chocolate brown over most of the body, fading to olive brown on the underside. Both the eyes and the ears are relatively small and are indistinct on external examination. The forepaws are large compared with other shrews, and have long claws. However, the species may be most easily distinguished from other small-eared shrews living in the same area by its upper canine teeth, which are unusually small, and are missing on one or both sides of the mouth in about 25% of individuals. Females have four teats, located on the inguinal region, while males have small, indistinct, scent glands on the flanks.

== Distribution and habitat ==
Merida small-eared shrews are found only in the Cordillera de Merida of the Venezuelan states of Trujillo, Mérida, and Táchira. They inhabit cloud forests and sub-alpine páramo habitats between 1,640 and 3,950 metres (5,380 and 12,960 ft) elevation. It may also be found in areas of disturbed forest or secondary scrubland bordering its natural habitat, but is more commonly found where vegetation is dense and leaf-litter is thick.

There are no recognised subspecies.

== Behaviour and biology ==
The Merida small-eared shrews feed primarily on invertebrates, such as earthworms, insects, spiders, centipedes and snails. They are relatively indiscriminate in the invertebrates they prey on, but about 70% of their diet consists of creatures found below the soil, rather than on the surface. They have also been reported to scavenge on dead vertebrates, and occasionally to feed on eggs or newborn rodents.

Although restricted to a relatively small geographic area, Merida small-eared shrews are common within their habitat, with population densities of up to 4.5 per hectare (1.8/acre) having been reported. Predators include barn owls, hawks, opossums, long-tailed weasels, and mountain coatis.

Reproduction apparently continues throughout the year, although it may be more common between March and April, and again between July and October. Litters range from two to four pups, with three being typical.
