= Goodwin's broad-clawed shrew =

Conservation status
- Least Concern (IUCN 3.1)

Scientific classification
- Kingdom: Animalia
- Phylum: Chordata
- Class: Mammalia
- Order: Eulipotyphla
- Family: Soricidae
- Genus: Cryptotis
- Species: C. goodwini

Binomial name
- Cryptotis goodwini Jackson, 1933
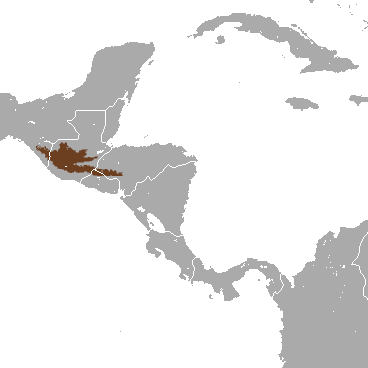
- Goodwin's broad-clawed shrew range

Species of mammal

Goodwin's broad-clawed shrew (Cryptotis goodwini) is a species of mammal in the shrew family, Soricidae. Body length and size of adults average 9.49 cm (3.74 in) and 7.0 g (0.25 oz) respectively making it a relatively larger shew. What distinguishes this from other shrews are its long claws.

== Habitat ==
They range from the south part of the Siera Madre of Chiapas, to the Sierra Madra of Guatemala to the west of El Salvador and Honduras. Within Mexico it is found only in the state of Chiapas. In this mountain range it has been found ranging from 915 m to 3350 m. These forests are known to be temperate clouded. However, the C. goodwini can also be found in pine, oak, cypress, fir forests. They like other shrews in the genus Cryptotis tend to live a fossorial lifestyle burrowing in the ground for both food and shelter.

== Description ==
The tail of C. goodwini shrew is short and it accounts for approximately 35% of their body length. The forelimbs of the shrew with its long claws distinguish this from other shrews. Relative to other shrews, their face is long and thin. Of all the species in the genus Crptotis, they show the greatest reduction in teeth. The color their coats changes each season. It is black with many vermiform (worm-like structures) during the winter. In the summer the coat lighter and lacks the worm-like structures.
