= Goldman's broad-clawed shrew =

Conservation status
- Least Concern (IUCN 3.1)

Scientific classification
- Kingdom: Animalia
- Phylum: Chordata
- Class: Mammalia
- Order: Eulipotyphla
- Family: Soricidae
- Genus: Cryptotis
- Species: C. goldmani

Binomial name
- Cryptotis goldmani (Merriam, 1895)
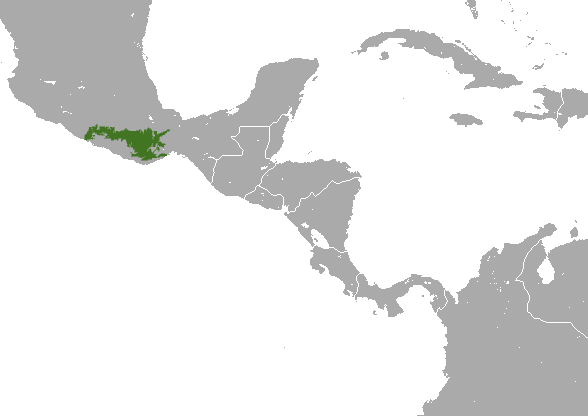
- Goldman's broad-clawed shrew range

Species of mammal

Goldman's broad-clawed shrew (Cryptotis goldmani) is a species of mammal in the family Soricidae. It is found in Guatemala and Mexico.
