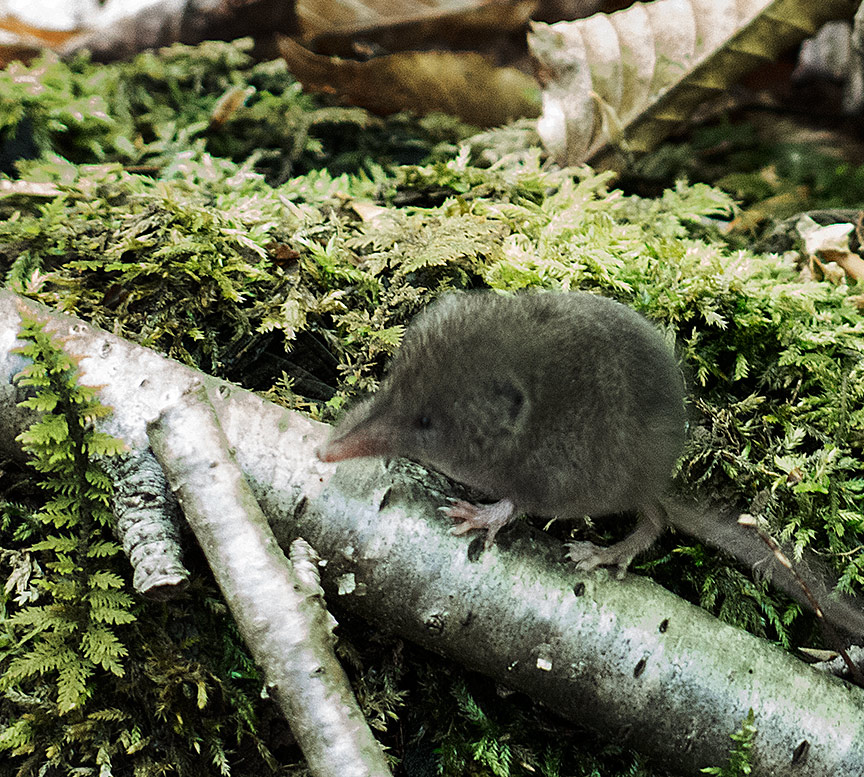

Conservation status
- Least Concern (IUCN 3.1)

Scientific classification
- Kingdom: Animalia
- Phylum: Chordata
- Class: Mammalia
- Order: Eulipotyphla
- Family: Soricidae
- Genus: Cryptotis
- Species: C. parva

Binomial name
- Cryptotis parva (Say, 1823)
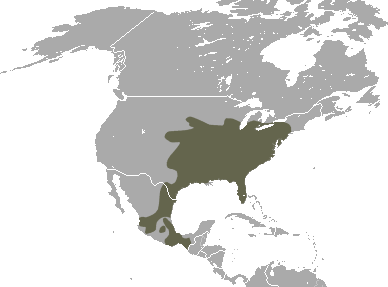
- North American least shrew range

= North American least shrew =

Species of mammal

The North American least shrew (Cryptotis parva) is one of the smallest mammals, growing to be only up to 3 inches long. It has a long pointed snout and a tail never more than twice the length of its hind foot. The dense fur coat is either grayish-brown or reddish-brown with a white belly. Its fur becomes lighter in the summer and darker in the winter. Although similar in appearance to several species of rodents, all shrews are members of the order Eulipotyphla and should not be mistaken for a member of the order Rodentia. The North American least shrew's eyes are small and its ears are completely concealed within its short fur, giving it very poor eyesight and hearing.

== Distribution ==
It is found from the grasslands of southern Canada through the eastern and central United States and Mexico. In Canada, only a small population of this animal has been found at Long Point in Ontario.

The North American least shrew mostly dwells in mesic grasslands, marshes, and meadows. Most shrews prefer these wet habitats, but the least shrew will also inhabit dry upland regions. This species can be found in meadows, fields, and weedy areas, where the vegetation attracts its insect diet.

== Behavior ==
This tiny shrew is active at all hours of the day, but mostly at night. Hunting by smell and touch, the North American least shrew digs through loose soil and leaf litter for its prey along the surface of the ground. The behavior of captive individuals suggests it can also tunnel through moist soil in search of food much like moles do. However, it mostly occupies burrows built by other mammals.

Its diet consists of mostly small invertebrates, such as caterpillars, beetle larvae, earthworms, centipedes, slugs, and sow bugs. It will also eat from the corpses of dead animals, and small amounts of seeds or fruits. This shrew will eat its prey whole, but when eating crickets and grasshoppers, the North American least shrew will bite off the head of its prey and eat only the internal organs. When fighting a larger creature, it will aim for the legs and try to cripple its adversary, and will bite lizards, which are often too large for it to kill, on the tail, which then falls off and provides it with a meal while the lizard escapes. The North American least shrew will also sometimes live inside beehives and eat all the larvae. It will often share its food with other shrews. It eats more than its body weight each day and is known to store food.

The North American least shrew makes its home in burrows or shallow runways under flat stones or fallen logs. Its burrows are about 2.5 cm in diameter, from 25 cm to 1.5 m long, and seldom more than 20 cm below the ground. Most shrews are aggressive towards each other, but this species is a social creature and often cooperates in digging its burrows and often sleeps with other shrews. From 2 to 31 of these shrews will live together at a time, although it is more common to find them together in the winter months to keep warm. It will line its burrows with leaves and grass in nests for the purpose of rearing offspring. The breeding season extends from early March to late November. Females produce two or more litters each season. Each litter will consist of about three to six young, each one weighing about 0.3 g, which grow quickly and will be adult size in about one month. Litters are born 21–23 days after copulation. When first born, young are deaf, blind, and hairless. At 14 days old, they will open their eyes and have fur. By day 21, they will weigh 4-5 g and weaning will begin. The North American least shrew rarely lives more than a year. Its natural predators are owls, hawks, the red fox, the raccoon, skunks, and snakes. The North American least shrew will try to defend itself with its venomous saliva.

== Evolutionary history ==
Evolutionary analysis seems to show the shrews evolved from the ancestor Crocidosorex in Europe and crossed over into the Nearctic, consisting of North and Central America, via the Bering Strait (above sea level at the time). The earliest fossils of shrews, Crocidosorex piveteaui, are from the family Soricidae and date back to the Oligocene epoch, but shrews are thought to have originated in the late Eocene (30-40 million years ago). It is debated whether four or five ancient subfamilies occurred, but only two are left today: Soricinae and Crocidurinae. Once the descendants of the Crocidosorex crossed into North America, this subfamily of Soricidae gave rise to the genus Antesorex during the Miocene. In the late Miocene, they split into Adeloblarina and Alluvisorex. From Adeloblarina, two genera, Blarina and Cryptotis, diverged during the Pliocene. The North American least shrew species, Cryptotis parva, then arose from the genus Cryptotis.

The primitive features of Cryptotis parva suggest its ancient origins. The zygomatic arches are missing in the skull, which are present in most mammals even of that size, such as rodents. The mandible also has a more primitive structure with a double articulating surface. The cerebral hemisphere is relatively small, which is necessary in manipulative abilities. However, the olfactory lobes are well developed, revealing the significance of the ability to smell in the shrew's survival. The reproductive and urinary systems are joined in one external opening, called the cloaca, which is a primitive character not found in higher mammals. Another trait uncommon in mammals is the testes are found inside the abdominal cavity.

== Research ==
Least shrews are being used in research as emesis models, to see how delta-9 tetrahydrocannabinol prevents emesis in the cannabinoid receptors. This research is especially useful for cancer patients because chemotherapy drugs, such as cisplatin, cause nausea and vomiting.

== Threats ==
The North American least shrew is listed as endangered in Connecticut and in Pennsylvania. The greatest threat to it is the development of coastal habitat, particularly dunes and marshes.
