= Honduran small-eared shrew =

Conservation status
- Data Deficient (IUCN 3.1)

Scientific classification
- Kingdom: Animalia
- Phylum: Chordata
- Class: Mammalia
- Order: Eulipotyphla
- Family: Soricidae
- Genus: Cryptotis
- Species: C. hondurensis

Binomial name
- Cryptotis hondurensis Woodman & Timm, 1992
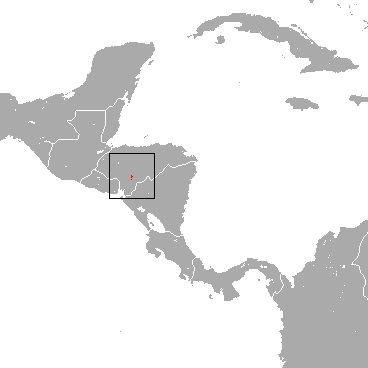
- Honduran small-eared shrew range

Species of mammal

The Honduran small-eared shrew (Cryptotis hondurensis) is a species of mammal in the family Soricidae. It is found in Honduras and possibly in El Salvador, Guatemala, and Nicaragua.

== Sources ==
- Woodman, N. & Matson, J. (2008). "Cryptotis hondurensis". IUCN Red List of Threatened Species. 2008 e.T5765A11669588. doi:10.2305/IUCN.UK.2008.RLTS.T5765A11669588.en.
