= Relict (biology) =

Taxon that was more prevalent in the past but is still extant

In biogeography and paleontology, a relict is a population or taxon of organisms that was more widespread or more diverse in the past. A relictual population is a population currently inhabiting a restricted area whose range was far wider during a previous geologic epoch. Similarly, a relictual taxon is a taxon (e.g. species or other lineage) which is the sole surviving representative of a formerly diverse group.

== Definition ==
A relict (or relic) plant or animal is a taxon that persists as a remnant of what was once a diverse and widespread population. Relictualism occurs when a widespread habitat or range changes and a small area becomes cut off from the whole. A subset of the population is then confined to the available hospitable area, and survives there while the broader population either shrinks or evolves divergently. This phenomenon differs from endemism in that the range of the population was not always restricted to the local region. In other words, the species or group did not necessarily arise in that small area, but rather was stranded, or insularized, by changes over time. The agent of change could be anything from competition from other organisms, continental drift, or climate change such as an ice age.

When a relict is representative of taxa found in the fossil record, and yet is still living, such an organism is sometimes referred to as a living fossil. However, a relict need not be currently living. An evolutionary relict is any organism that was characteristic of the flora or fauna of one age and that persisted into a later age, with the later age being characterized by newly evolved flora or fauna significantly different from those that came before.

== Examples ==
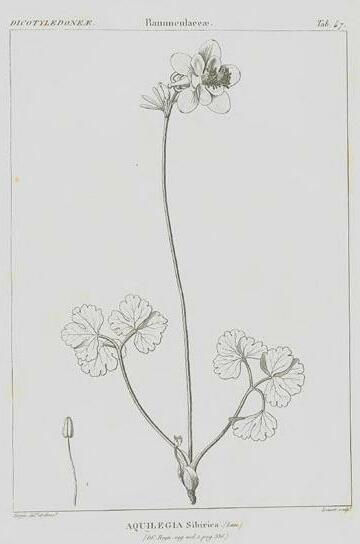
The population of the Siberian columbine in the Central Siberian Plateau is considered a quaternary relict.

A notable example is the thylacine of Tasmania, a relict marsupial carnivore that survived into modern times on an island, whereas the rest of its species on mainland Australia had gone extinct between 3000 and 2000 years ago.

Another example is Omma, a genus of beetle with a fossil record extending back over 200 million years to the Late Triassic and found worldwide during the Jurassic and Cretaceous, now confined to a single living species in Australia. Another relict from the Triassic is Pholadomya, a common clam genus during the Mesozoic, now confined to a single rare species in the Caribbean.

The tuatara endemic to New Zealand is the only living member of the once-diverse reptile order Rhynchocephalia, which has a fossil record stretching back 240 million years and during the Mesozoic era was globally distributed and ecologically diverse.

An example from the fossil record would be a specimen of Nimravidae, an extinct branch of carnivores in the mammalian evolutionary tree, if said specimen came from Europe in the Miocene epoch. If that was the case, the specimen would represent, not the main population, but a last surviving remnant of the nimravid lineage. These carnivores were common and widespread in the previous epoch, the Oligocene, and disappeared when the climate changed and woodlands were replaced by savanna. They persisted in Europe in the last remaining forests as a relict of the Oligocene: a relict species in a relict habitat.

An example of divergent evolution creating relicts is found in the shrews of the islands off the coast of Alaska, namely the Pribilof Island shrew and the St. Lawrence Island shrew. These species are apparently relicts of a time when the islands were connected to the mainland, and these species were once conspecific with a more widespread species, now the cinereus shrew, the three populations having diverged through speciation.

In botany, an example of an ice age relict plant population is the Snowdon lily, notable as being precariously rare in Wales. The Welsh population is confined to the north-facing slopes of Snowdonia, where climatic conditions are apparently similar to ice age Europe. Some have expressed concern that the warming climate will cause the lily to die out in Great Britain. Other populations of the same plant can be found in the Arctic and in the mountains of Europe and North America, where it is known as the common alplily.

While the extirpation of a geographically disjunct population of a relict species may be of regional conservation concern, outright extinction at the species level may occur in this century of rapid climate change if geographic range occupied by a relict species has already contracted to the degree that it is narrowly endemic. For this reason, the traditional conservation tool of translocation has recently been reframed as assisted migration of narrowly endemic, critically endangered species that are already (or soon expected) to experience climate change beyond their levels of tolerance. Two examples of critically endangered relict species for which assisted migration projects are already underway are the western swamp tortoise of Australia and a subcanopy conifer tree in the United States called Florida Torreya. An example of citizens around the globe actively taking part in planting a relict tree with an extremely narrow native range pertains to the Australian Wollemia nobilis, which was discovered in 1994. Ten years after safeguarding of rooted branch cuttings had been initiated in botanic gardens around the world, commercial growers were authorized to receive surplus cuttings to propagate for sales to their own customers. This unusual management decision for an endangered plant owed to the "huge public interest in this rare tree" and as an experiment to test whether commercial availability would serve "to protect wild populations from illegal collecting."

More than a century ago, an Asian relict tree became not only a horticultural favorite in the United States and Europe but was found to be well suited for urban street tree planting. This was Ginkgo biloba and it is highly tolerant of pollution. Ginkgo is the last living representative of the plant family Ginkgoales. Ancestral ginkgos had a diverse and widespread northern distribution during the Mesozoic.

The Saimaa ringed seal (Phoca saimensis) is an endemic species, a relict of the last ice age that lives only in Finland in the landlocked and fragmented Saimaa freshwater lake complex. Now the population has fewer than 400 individuals, which poses a threat to its survival.

Another example is the relict leopard frog once found throughout Nevada, Arizona, Utah, and Colorado, but now only found at Lake Mead National Recreation Area in Nevada and Arizona.

The transition from marine to freshwater environments does not always require substantial genomic rearrangements. For instance, comparative analysis of complete mitochondrial genomes reveals only minor differences (~1%) between marine sprats and the obligately freshwater Abrau sprat (Clupeonella abrau), which is considered a freshwater relict from the post-Miocene regression of the brackish Pontic Lake-Sea. This suggests that despite prolonged residence in fresh waters and ecological shifts in habitus, these fish have retained high mitogenomic stability.

== Relevance ==
The concept of relictualism is useful in understanding the ecology and conservation status of populations that have become insularized, meaning confined to one small area or multiple small areas with no chance of movement between populations. Insularization makes a population vulnerable to forces that can lead to extinction, such as disease, inbreeding, habitat destruction, competition from introduced species, and global warming. Consider the case of the white-eyed river martin, a very localized species of bird found only in Southeast Asia, and extremely rare, if not already extinct. Its closest and only surviving living relative is the African river martin, also very localized in central Africa. These two species are the only known members of the subfamily Pseudochelidoninae, and their widely disjunct populations suggest they are relict populations of a more common and widespread ancestor. Known to science only since 1968, it seems to have disappeared.

Studies have been done on relict populations in isolated mountain and valley habitats in western North America, where the basin and range topography creates areas that are insular in nature, such as forested mountains surrounded by inhospitable desert, called sky islands. Such situations can serve as refuges for certain Pleistocene relicts, such as Townsend's pocket gopher, while at the same time creating barriers for biological dispersal. Studies have shown that such insular habitats have a tendency toward decreasing species richness. This observation has significant implications for conservation biology, because habitat fragmentation can also lead to the insularization of stranded populations.

So-called "relics of cultivation" are plant species that were grown in the past for various purposes (medicinal, food, dyes, etc.), but are no longer utilized. They are naturalized and can be found at archaeological sites.

== See also ==
- Living fossil
