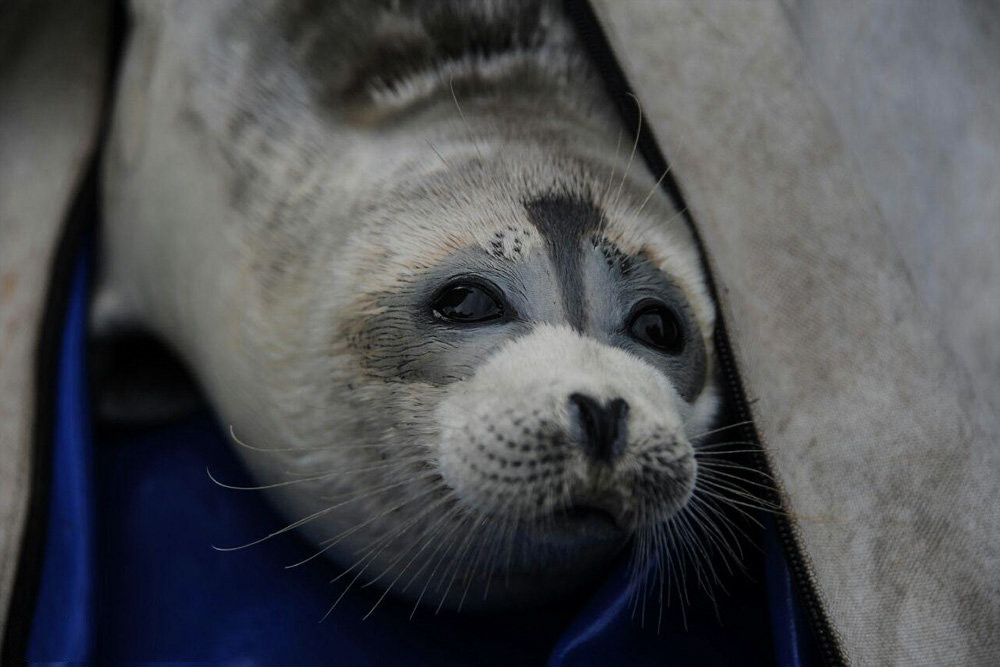
- A Caspian seal in Iran

Conservation status
- Endangered (IUCN 3.1)

Scientific classification
- Kingdom: Animalia
- Phylum: Chordata
- Class: Mammalia
- Order: Carnivora
- Parvorder: Pinnipedia
- Family: Phocidae
- Genus: Pusa
- Species: P. caspica

Binomial name
- Pusa caspica (Gmelin, 1788)
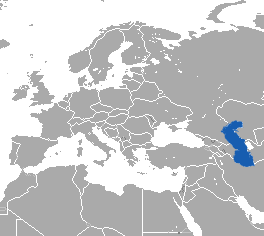
- Caspian seal range

Synonyms
- Phoca caspica

= Caspian seal =

Species of seal endemic to the Caspian Sea

The Caspian seal (Pusa caspica, syn. Phoca caspica) is one of the smallest members of the earless seal family and unique in that it is found exclusively in the brackish Caspian Sea. It lives along the shorelines, but also on the many rocky islands and floating blocks of ice that dot the Caspian Sea. In winter and cooler parts of the spring and autumn season, it populates the northern Caspian coastline. As the ice melts in the summer and warmer parts of the spring and autumn season, it also occurs in the deltas of the Volga and Ural Rivers, as well as the southern latitudes of the Caspian where the water is cooler due to greater depth.

Evidence suggests that the colonization events of Caspian seals were probably facilitated by river connections from the Arctic that have since disappeared, land-locking the populations sometime before the major Pleistocene glaciations.

Since the beginning of the 1900s, the population has dropped by over 90%. In 2022, a substantial die-off of the endangered species was reported, threatening the isolated population at an estimated number from fewer than 70,000 by the Caspian Seals Research and Rehabilitation Center to 168,000 by the Marine Mammal Protected Areas Task Force.

== Description ==
Adults are about 126–129 cm (50–51 in) in length. Males are longer than females at an early age, but females experience more rapid growth until they reach ten years of age. Males can grow gradually until they reach an age of about 30 or 40 years. Their lifespan is around 40-50 years. The maximum reported size is 1.8 m (5 ft 11 in) in length and 86 kg (190 lb) in weight. males are generally larger and bulkier. Their dental formula is 3.1.4.22.1.4.1.

The skull structure of the Caspian seal suggests it is closely related to the Baikal seal. In addition, the morphological structures in both species suggest they are descended from the ringed seal which migrated from larger bodies of water around two million years ago.

== Diet ==
Caspian seals are primarily piscivorous. They eat a variety of food depending on season and availability. A typical diet for Caspian seals found in the northern Caspian sea consists of crustaceans and various fish species, such as Clupeonella engrauliformis, C. grimmi, C. caspia, Gobiidae, Rutilus caspicus, Atherina boyeri, and Sander lucioperca. Caspian seal adults eat about 2–3 kg (4–7 lb) of fish a day and almost a metric ton of fish per year.

In autumn and winter, Caspian seals prey mostly on sculpins, gobies, and crustaceans while inhabiting shallow waters in the northern part of the sea. During the summer, in the southern part of the Caspian Sea, they eat herring, roach, carp, sprat, and smelt. When Caspian seals live in estuaries, they eat large amounts of the freshwater species, Sander lucioperca. Other prey include shrimp, crab, and silversides.

Being one of the top predators in the ecosystem, Caspian seals accumulate hazardous chemicals found inside their bodies such as heavy metals, organochlorine compounds, and radionuclides.

== Behavior and ecology ==
Caspian seals are shallow divers, typically diving 50 m (160 ft) for about one minute, although scientists have recorded Caspian seals diving deeper and for longer periods of time. After foraging during a dive, they rest at the surface of the water.

In the summer and winter, during mating season, Caspian seals tend to live in large groups. At other times of the year, these seals are solitary. During the summer, however, they make aggressive snorts or use flipper waving to tell other seals to keep their distance. Little else is known about their behavior.

=== Reproduction ===
Male and female Caspian seals are monogamous. Among breeding seals, a lack of fighting for a mate seems prevalent. In late autumn, Caspian seals travel to the northern part of the Caspian Sea where the water is shallow and frozen to give birth in secluded areas on ice sheets after a gestation period of 11 months. Normally, pregnancy rates are 40 to 70%, but are currently at an all-time low of 30%. In late January to early February, female seals give birth to one pup each. Similar to other ringed seals, these pups are born with white pelages and weigh about 5 kg (11 lb). Caspian seals employ a capital breeding lactation strategy, where the mother will fast while nursing the pup, sometimes with a small amount of supplemental feeding. Pups are weaned after a few weeks. The pups' white coats are molted at around three weeks to a month. Male pups become sexually mature after six to seven years, whereas female pups sexually mature after five to seven years. Newborn pups are not fully grown until 8 to 10 years after they are born. Breeding begins a few weeks after the birth of last year's pup around late February to mid March. Breeding usually occurs after weaning of a newborn pup, but can begin while the pup is still nursing. Caspian seals migrate back to the southern part of the Caspian Sea after the breeding season and molting in late April because the north begins to warm with constant ice melting. The southern region of the Caspian Sea has deep, colder waters where the seals spend the summer months.

=== Habitat ===
The seal is found exclusively in the Caspian Sea, which is nestled between 5 countries; Azerbaijan, Iran, Kazakhstan, Russia, and Turkmenistan. Caspian seals can be found not only along the shorelines, but also on the many rocky islands and floating blocks of ice that dot the Caspian Sea. During winter, seals migrate northward in the Caspian to mate, give birth, and care for their young on the frozen ice. As the ice melts in the warmer season, they can be found on the mouths of the Volga and Ural Rivers, as well as the southern latitudes of the Caspian where cooler waters can be found due to greater depth.

One notable attribute of Caspian seals is its adaptation to a wide range of air temperatures and the extreme climate of its habitat. Temperatures in the Caspian Sea range from -35 °C in the winter months to +40 °C in the summer, sitting at the southernmost limit for ice formation in winter with sub-tropical conditions for the rest of the year. In winter, and cooler parts of the spring and autumn season, the seals populate the Northern Caspian. In the first days of April, spring migration to the southern part of the Caspian Sea begins with mature female seals and their pups. Male mature seals stay in the northern Caspian Sea longer and wait until the moulting is completed. In summer, seals find empty places in the western part of Apsheron for resting. In the eastern part, the most crowded place used to be the Ogurchinskiy Island, but by 2001, fewer than 10 pups were recorded on Ogurchinsky, some of which were killed by people on the island.

== Threats ==
=== Diseases ===
Several recent cases of large numbers of Caspian seals dying due to canine distemper virus have been reported, in 1997, 2000 and 2001. In April 2000, a mass die-off of Caspian seals was first reported near the mouth of the Ural River in Kazakhstan. It spread south to the Mangistau region, and by the end of May, more than 10,000 seals had died along the Kazakhstan coast. High death rates were also recorded in May and June along the Apsheron peninsula of Azerbaijan and the Turkmenistan coast.

Clinical signs of infected seals included debilitation, muscle spasms, ocular and nasal exudation, and sneezing. Necropsies performed in June 2000 on eight Azerbaijan seals revealed microscopic lesions, including bronchointerstitial pneumonia, encephalitis, pancreatitis and lymphocytic depletion in lymphoid tissues. Similar lesions were also discovered on four seals from Kazakhstan. Morbillivirus antigen was also detected in multiple tissues, including lung, lymph nodes, spleen, brain, pancreas, liver, and epithelial tissue of the reproductive, urinary, and gastrointestinal tracts. Such tissue lesions are characteristic of distemper in both terrestrial and aquatic mammals.

Tissues from 12 carcasses found in Kazakhstan, Azerbaijan, and Turkmenistan were examined for morbillivirus nucleic acid. Sequences from the examination showed that canine distemper virus, which is part of the genus Morbillivirus, was the primary cause of death. The sequences also proved that seals from widely separated regions of the Caspian Sea were infected by the same virus. This finding established spatial and temporal links between the seal deaths in these regions. The sequences were also identical to that of canine distemper virus found in the brain tissue of a seal that died in 1997 and showed no morbillivirus lesions. This suggests persistence of canine distemper virus in the Caspian seal population over a span of several years or repeated spillover from the same terrestrial reservoir.

Another study in 2000 using 18 Caspian seal corpses found several concurrent bacterial infections that could have contributed to the illness of the affected seals. These include Bordetella bronchiseptica, Streptococcus phocae, Salmonella dublin, and S. choleraesuis. Corynebacterium caspium, a new bacterium, was identified in one of the seals, and poxvirus, Atopobacter phocae, Eimeria- and Sarcocystis-like organisms, and a Halarachne species were identified in Caspian seals for the first time. The study also asserts that the "unusually mild" winter that preceded the die-off in 2000 could have contributed to its cause "through increased ambient air pressure and accelerated disappearance of ice cover at the breeding areas in the northern Caspian Sea."

=== Threats ===
The Caspian seal is monogamous and mates only once annually; the pregnancy rate of females has dropped to a historic low of just 30%. A century ago, the population was estimated at 1.5 million seals; in 2005, 104,000 remained, dropping by over 90%. The decline is estimated to be 3–4% per year, primarily due to fisheries bycatch of over 17,000 seals in 2019. Other threats include habitat encroachment, outbreaks of phocine distemper virus, climate change, and pollution. In 2022, the Caspian Seal Research and Rehabilitation Center (CSRRC) estimated the population at fewer than 70,000. It is listed as endangered on the IUCN Red List.

In a three-week period in February 1978, wolves were responsible for the killing of numerous seals near Astrakhan. An estimated 17 to 40% of the seals in the area were killed, but not eaten.

Due to increased industrial production in the area, pollution has had an effect on the survival of the Caspian seal. From 1998 to 2000, the concentration of zinc and iron increased dramatically in the tissue of dead, diseased seals. This suggests these elements are causative agents in compromising the Caspian seal's immune system.

Sea eagles are known to hunt these seals, which results in a high number of fatalities for the juveniles. They are also hunted by humans for subsistence and commerce. As of 2006, commercial icebreaker routes have passed through areas with high Caspian seal pup concentrations, which may contribute to loss of habitat.

A 2022 Caspian seal die-off was reported, with initial reports of 700 corpses later revised upwards to 2,500. The cause is unknown.

== See also ==
- Tyuleniy Archipelago and Tyuleny Island, both named after the Caspian seals
- Ringed seal, Pusa hispida
- Baikal seal, Pusa sibirica
