= Barren ground shrew =

Conservation status
- Least Concern (IUCN 3.1)

Scientific classification
- Kingdom: Animalia
- Phylum: Chordata
- Class: Mammalia
- Order: Eulipotyphla
- Family: Soricidae
- Genus: Sorex
- Species: S. ugyunak

Binomial name
- Sorex ugyunak Anderson & Rand, 1945
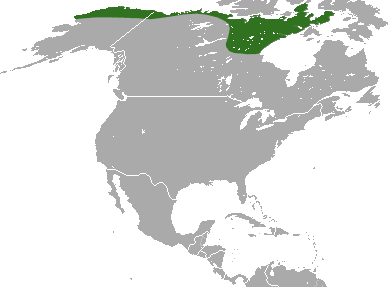
- Barren ground shrew range

Species of mammal

The barren ground shrew (Sorex ugyunak) is a small shrew found in northern Canada west of Hudson Bay and in Alaska. At one time, this species was considered to be a subspecies of the similar cinereus shrew (S. cinereus). It is similar in appearance and thought to be closely related to the Saint Lawrence Island shrew (S. jacksoni) and Pribilof Island shrew (S. pribilofensis).

It is dark brown on its back with grey-brown sides and underparts; the tail is pale brown on top and light below with a light brown tip. Its body is about 8 cm (3.1 in) in length including a 3 cm (1.2 in) long tail. It weighs about 4 g (0.14 oz). This animal is found north of the tree line, in wet meadows or thickets in the tundra. It eats insects, small invertebrates and seeds.

The epithet name ugyunak is the Inuit word for "shrew".
