= Fishing industry in Turkmenistan =

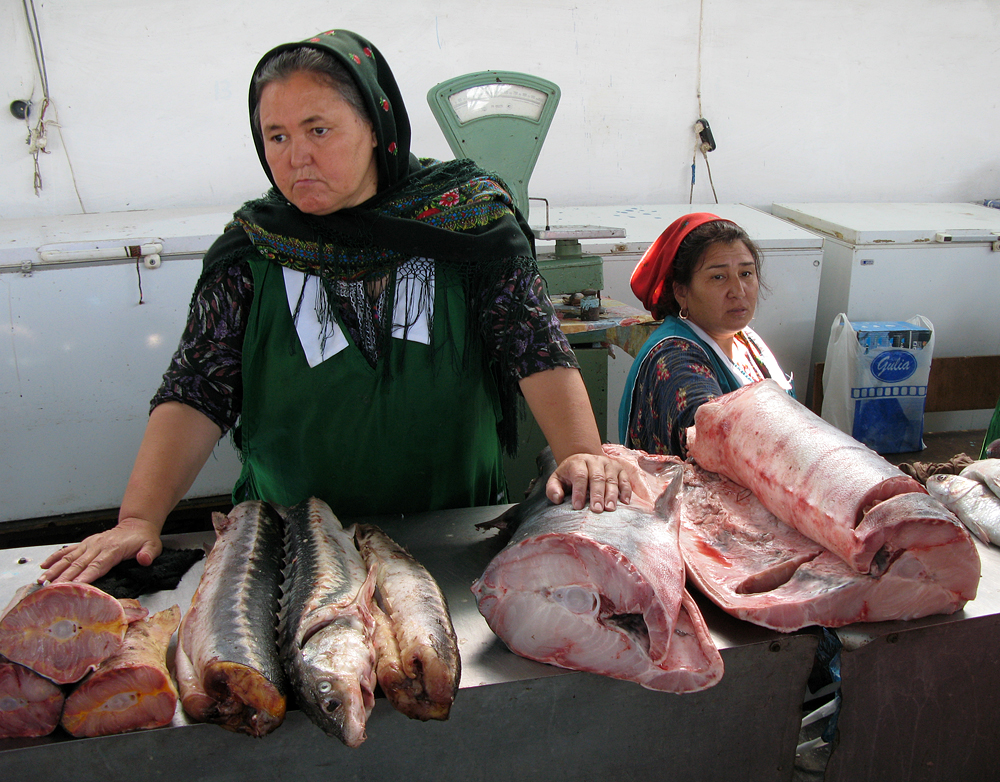
Sturgeon-fish at a market in Türkmenbaşy, Turkmenistan

The fishing industry in Turkmenistan has been of benefit to the economy of Turkmenistan and food supply, particularly on the Caspian Sea for centuries. The fishing industry took off around 1910 in Turkmenistan but declined between 1950 and 1990, with the banning of sturgeon catching in Turkmen waters. Today, the fishing industry is developing rapidly, due to technological modernization and renewal schemes and the growth of aquaculture. Under the command of the Turkmen president, fishing facilities in the country have been reconstructed and constructed with modern industry infrastructure, particularly in the Caspian Sea 610 km coastline of western Turkmenistan in Balkan Province.

== Overview ==
Turkmenistan sea fishery resources primarily consist of kilka (clupeonella delicatula) and are exploited by Balkanbalyk, a state-owned company which had some 11 large vessels, 12 medium-sized vessels, 10 transport vessels supporting the fishing fleet, 4 tug-boats and 3 others in the mid 1990s. As the industry has become modernised since independence so has the capabilities of the vessels. Fish, however, is not widely consumed all across Turkmenistan and it is mainly confined to the coast and eaten by people living in the coastal area. Therefore, the total employment in the whole sector in 1996 was about 2,200 persons. Fish consumption has continued to decline in Turkmenistan from about 8 kg in 1991 to 1.3 kg in 1995.

== Protection ==
Annual quotas limit the catch of sturgeon and in the Turkmen waters of the Caspian Sea the fishing of sturgeon is prohibited, having been limited in 1942 and finally banned in 1946. The quota is therefore caught in Russian waters for a fee, and the products are then shipped to Turkmenistan. Fishing is however permitted in the several small lakes and rivers in the country, notably the Amu Darya, Murgab, and Tejen Rivers.

The Perspectives of Fish Industry of Turkmenistan and International Co-Operation Scientific Conference have played a role in the fishing industry in Turkmenistan, particularly in environmental issues, such as ensuring the preservation of the largest population of sturgeon in the Caspian Sea. In 2008, the Fishing Industry of Turkmenistan International Exhibition was opened at the Exhibition Centre in the Turkmen capital of Ashgabad with the aim at linking the national industry and issues on an international level. Guests from some 16 countries including the United Kingdom, Russia, Turkey, the United Arab Emirates, Germany, Italy, Japan and China.

The Turkmenistan Fishery Protection is also active in the country and is closely tied with some of the topic marine institutes in the United States. In November 2008, a 50–60 cm long Alligator gar was caught in the north of Esenguly by two officials of this group. Later Dr. R. Mayden, Saint Louis University and Dr. Eric Hilton, Virginia Institute of Marine Science studied the remnants of the fish and confirmed it as such.
