= Pribilof Island shrew =

Conservation status
- Endangered (IUCN 3.1)

- Vulnerable (NatureServe)

Scientific classification
- Kingdom: Animalia
- Phylum: Chordata
- Class: Mammalia
- Order: Eulipotyphla
- Family: Soricidae
- Genus: Sorex
- Species: S. hydrodromus

Binomial name
- Sorex hydrodromus Merriam, 1895
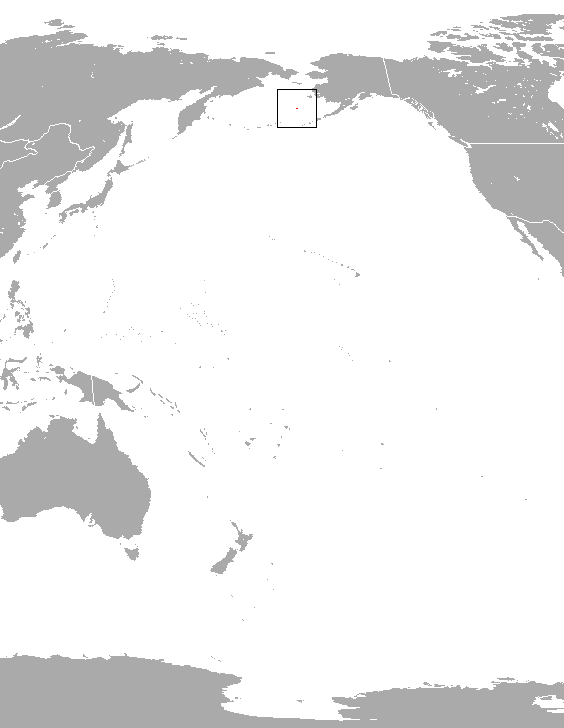
- Pribilof Island shrew range
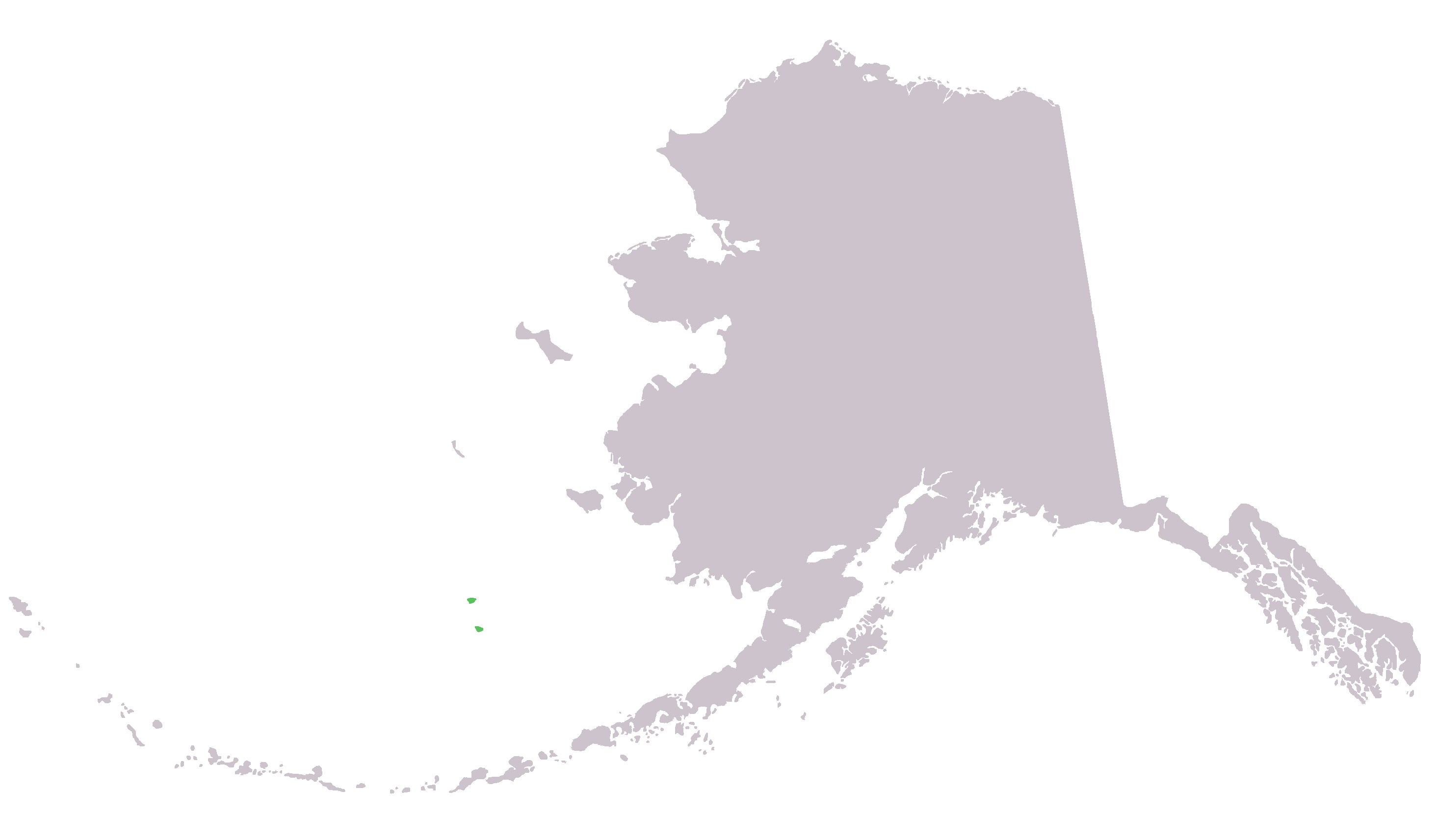
- Sorex hydrodromus range

Synonyms
- Sorex pribilofensis

Species of mammal

The Pribilof Island shrew (Sorex hydrodromus or Sorex pribilofensis) is a small, short tailed species of mammal in the family Soricidae (shrews). It is endemic to and found only on Alaska's Pribilof Islands. Due to its distinct tricoloured coat, it was originally thought to be related to the Arctic shrew (Sorex arcticus), but it is in fact much closer to the Cinereus shrew (Sorex cinereus) in its geographical distribution and morphological traits. Not much is known about the population size, breeding habits, ecology, and the general biology of the shrew.

== Description ==
General description

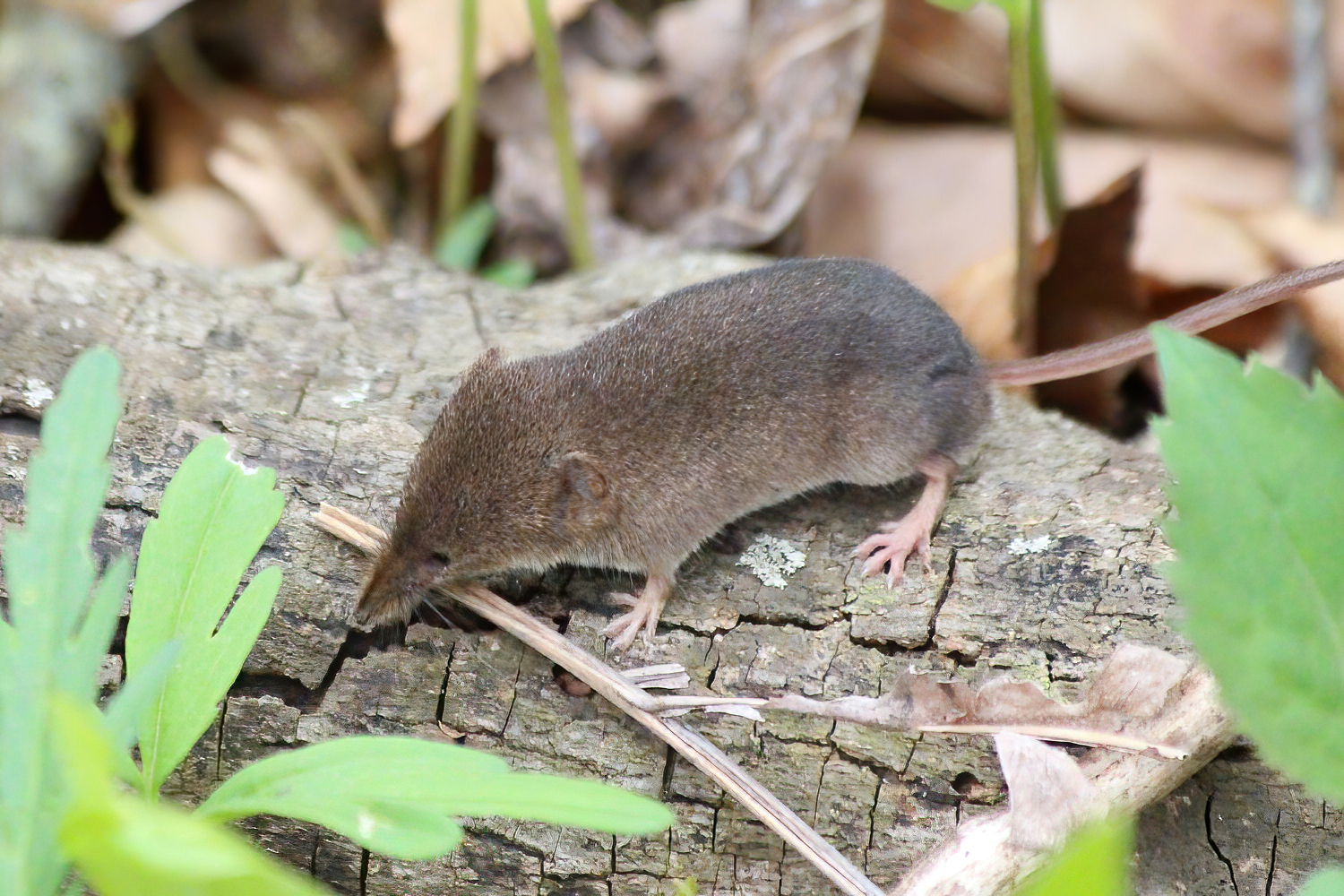
Sorex cinereus, the Cinereus shrew, of which the Pribilof Island shrew is closest morphologically.

In the summer months, the shrew's pelage is tricoloured with a brownish back, pale-brownish sides, and a grey underside. In the winter, the shrew's pelage is bicoloured with a brownish back and a grey underside. It has a short tail. The length of the shrew ranges from 9.3 to 9.7 cm (3.7 to 3.8 in); its tail length ranging from 3.3 to 4.3 cm (1.3 to 1.7 in); its hind foot length ranging from 1.2 to 1.3 cm (0.51 in). Its weight typically ranges from 4 to 5 g (0.14 to 0.18 oz). It has a long, slender, pointed snout and has five-clawed toes on both fore- and hind feet.

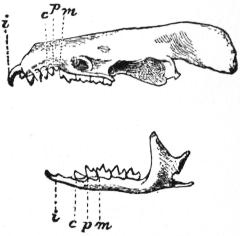
Diagram of shrew maxilla and mandible. i denotes the incisors, c denotes the unicuspids, P denotes the premolars, m denotes the molars. Note that this is not the specific diagram of the Pribilof Island shrew dentition.

Skull anatomy

The skull is broad, with a dental pattern similar to the Cinereus shrew (S. cinereus), the Barren ground shrew (S. ugyunak), and the Saint Lawrence Island shrew (S. jacksoni). The first and second unicuspid are similar in size; the third unicuspid is slightly larger or similar in size than the fourth. The fifth unicuspid is very small. It has large incisors compared to shrew species such as Alaska tiny shrew (S. yukonicus). The anterior and posterior tooth cusps (incisors, unicuspids, premolars, molars) have a chestnut-coloured tip distinctive of the 33 species of North American shrews.

== Distribution ==
The Pribilof Island shrew is found exclusively on the Saint Paul Island of the Pribilof Islands, just west of Alaska, in the Bering Sea. It is endemic to the Pribilof Islands, however there is some confusion of its type locality. The shrew has been found in marshy habitats dominated by Leymus arenarius (lyme grass).

== See also ==
- Cinereus shrew
- Saint Lawrence Island shrew
- Barren ground shrew
- Arctic shrew
