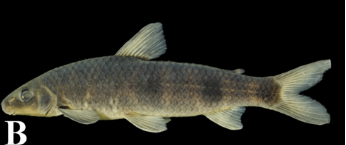

Conservation status
- Least Concern (IUCN 3.1)

Scientific classification
- Kingdom: Animalia
- Phylum: Chordata
- Class: Actinopterygii
- Order: Characiformes
- Family: Anostomidae
- Genus: Hypomasticus
- Species: H. mormyrops

Binomial name
- Hypomasticus mormyrops (Steindachner, 1875)

Synonyms
- Leporinus mormyrops Steindachner, 1875

= Hypomasticus mormyrops =

Species of fish

Hypomasticus mormyrops is a species of freshwater ray-finned fish belonging to the family Anostomidae, the toothed headstanders. This fish is endemic to southeastern Brazil.

== Taxonomy ==
Hypomasticus mormyrops was first formally described as Leporinus mormyrops in 1875 by the Austrian ichthyologist Franz Steindachner, with its type locality given as the Río Parahyba and the Río Piabanha in Brazil. In 1929, the Russian-American ichthyologist Nikolai Andreyevich Borodin proposed the new genus Hypomasticus for some species previously classified in Leporinus, and designated L. mormyrops as its type species. The genus Hypomasticus is classified within the subfamily Leporininae of the toothed headstander family, Anostomidae. Anostomidae is classified in the suborder Characoidei of the order Characiformes, the characins and related fishes.

== Etymology ==
Hypomasticus mormyrops is the type species of the genus Hypomasticus, a name which prefixes hypo-, meaning "under", with masticus, which is derived from the Greek mastax, meaning "that with which one chews" or, in other words, the mouth. This is an allusion to the mouth of this species being under the snout, or inferior. The specific name, mormyrops, means similar to the African freshwater elephantfish genus Mormyrus, a reference to these tawo taxa having similar fleshy snouts.

== Description ==
Hypomasticus mormyrops has three dark blotches on the sides of the body, and four teeth on each premaxilla and dentary. The caudal peduncle has a count of 12 scale rows around it. This species has a fleshy snout and inferior mouth, and reaches a maximum standard length of 21.2 cm (8.3 in).

== Distribution and habitat ==
Hypomasticus mormyrops is endemic to Brazil, where it is found in the dtainage systems of the Paraíba, Piabanha, Doce and Jequitinhonha rivers, and in the coastal river systems between the Paraíba do Sul, São Paulo and Rio de Janeiro rivers, and Jucuruçu. It has been recorded from the states of Bahia, Espírito Santo, Minas Gerais, Rio de Janeiro and São Paulo. This species is commonest in stretches of river with rocky bottoms.
