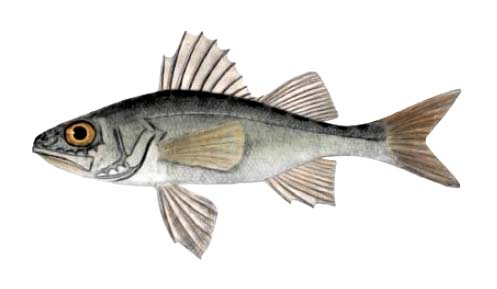

Conservation status
- Least Concern (IUCN 3.1)

Scientific classification
- Kingdom: Animalia
- Phylum: Chordata
- Class: Actinopterygii
- Order: Perciformes
- Family: Percidae
- Genus: Percarina
- Species: P. demidoffii

Binomial name
- Percarina demidoffii Nordmann, 1840

Synonyms
- Percarina demidoffi demidoffi Nordmann, 1840

= Common percarina =

Species of fish

Common percarina (Percarina demidoffii) is a species of fish in the family Percidae. It is found in northwestern Black Sea basin in estuaries and coastal lakes, and in the lower reaches of the rivers that drain into that part of the Black Sea. It is a carnivorous species.

== Description ==
The common percarina is distinguished from its congener P. maeotica by having no scales on its cheek, by having nearly transparent membranes on the body and fins, the upper body is milky white in colour with no spots. It also has 8–9 round or irregular markings on the base of both dorsal fins. The dorsal fins are clearly separate in both species of Percarina and in this species the first dorsal fin contains 9–10 spines while the second dorsal fin contains 3 spines and 10–12 soft rays. The anal fin has 2 spines and 8–11 soft rays. this species has a maximum published standard length of 10 centimetres (3.9 in).

== Distribution ==
The common percarina is found in eastern Europe in the northwestern Black Sea where it occurs in estuaries and coastal lagoons and in the lower reaches of the Danube, Dniester, Southern Bug and Dnieper. The 2016 discovery of the common percarina in the Zaporizske Reservoir in Ukraine advances its known distribution upstream on the Dnieper River and extends its current range. It also shows that this species is able to adapt to a fully freshwater environment. The common percarina has been recorded from Ukraine, Moldova and Romania.

== Habitat and biology ==
The common percarina is considered to be a freshwater species which can easily adapt to brackish or saline environments. It is a schooling species which is both demeral and pelagic being normally found near the bottom but can also been found in the water column. It is commonest at depths of around 5 metres (16 ft) where the substrate is made up of black mud. It has been recorded in mixed shoals with the Black Sea sprat (Clupeonella cultriventris). It is a predatory species and its diet includes the eggs of fishes, juvenile fishes of species such as sprats, silversides and gobies, zooplankton, small crustaceans, polychaete worms and insect larvae. They have been known to eat phytoplankton too. It spawns in coastal waters around the mouths of rivers where there is a muddy bottom and this takes place in May and June.

== Taxonomy ==
The common percarina was first formally described in 1840 by the Finnish biologist Alexander von Nordmann (1803–1866) with the type locality given as the Dniester river, in the vicinity of the town of "Akkerman". The specific name honours Anatole de Demidoff (1813–1817).
