= Clupeonella muhlisi =

Conservation status
- Endangered (IUCN 3.1)

Scientific classification
- Kingdom: Animalia
- Phylum: Chordata
- Class: Actinopterygii
- Order: Clupeiformes
- Family: Ehiravidae
- Genus: Clupeonella
- Species: C. muhlisi

Binomial name
- Clupeonella muhlisi Neu, 1934

Synonyms
- Clupeonella abrau muhlisi Neu, 1934

Species of fish

Clupeonella muhlisi is a species of clupeid fish endemic to Lake Uluabat in Turkey, linked to the Sea of Marmara.

It is a small fish, up to 8 cm in length, that shoals at the water surface. It feeds on pelagic crustaceans and fish eggs.

This population of sprat has previously been considered either conspecific with Clupeonella abrau that inhabits Lake Abrau, Russia, near the northeastern Black Sea coast, or a distinct subspecies of that species, Clupeonella abrau muhlisi, or a population belonging to the more widespread Black Sea sprat (Clupeonella cultriventris).
