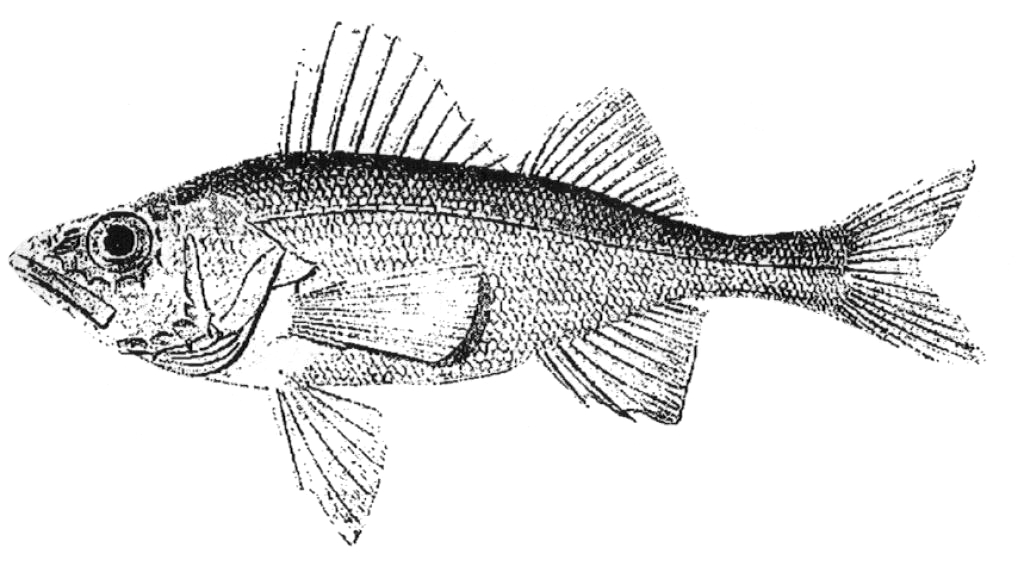

Conservation status
- Least Concern (IUCN 3.1)

Scientific classification
- Kingdom: Animalia
- Phylum: Chordata
- Class: Actinopterygii
- Order: Perciformes
- Family: Percidae
- Genus: Percarina
- Species: P. maeotica

Binomial name
- Percarina maeotica Kuznetsov, 1888

Synonyms
- Percarina demidoffi maeotica Kuznetsov, 1888

= Azov percarina =

Species of fish

Azov percarina (Percarina maeotica) is a species of ray-finned fish in the family Percidae.

== Description ==
The Azov percarina is distinguished from the closely related common percarina, Percarina demidoffii, by its unique characteristics of having scaled cheeks, pigmented body back and grey flanks with numerous small dark dots, which may be fused into larger spots along base of the dorsal fins.

== Distribution ==
The Azov percarina is found in the eastern and northeastern parts of the Sea of Azov, in the Gulf of Taganrog and Temryuk Bay, Bolshoi Akhtanizovski Liman, Kuban River delta, rare in Don River delta.

== Habitat and biology ==
The Azov percarina is foun in coastal fresh and brackish waters, the maximum salinity they are found in is 7 ppt, and in river mouths. It is a social species which is found in shoals. Smaller fish, with a standard length of 6 millimetres (0.24 in) feed actively on zooplankton, especially small crustaceans, Once they attain a standard length of 16 to 40 millimetres (0.63 to 1.57 in) they switch to feeding on larger crustaceans such as copepods and mysids. From their second year they are largely piscivorous feeding on Knipowitschia longecaudata and Clupeonella cultriventis as well as benthic worms, molluscs and insect larvae. They reach sexual maturity at a year old. They are known to spawn in the least saline part of the Gulf of Taganrog during June and July. Immediately following spawning the adults migrate to the open sea. The eggs are released over mud bottom and hatch in 2 days, after which the larvae lie on bottom, moving to the surface after 4 days.

== Taxonomy ==
The Azov percarina was first formally described in 1888 by I.D. Kuznetsov with the type locality given as the northeastern Sea of Azov. It is some times treated as a subspecies of the common percarina (Percarinde demidoffi) but morphological and habitat differences support its treatment as a valid species. The common percarina has been recorded from Ukraine, Moldova and Romania.
