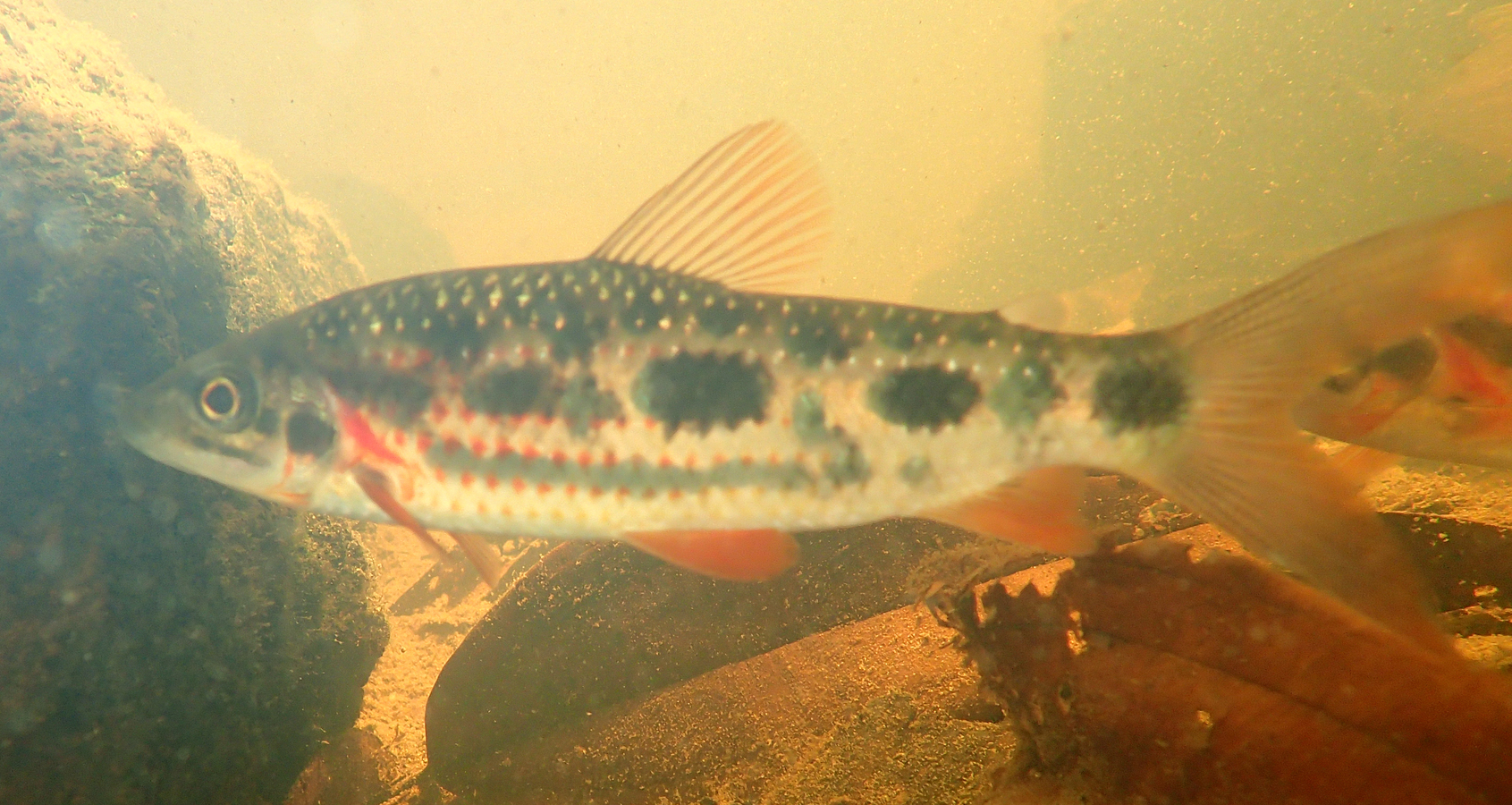
- Hypomasticus granti

Scientific classification
- Kingdom: Animalia
- Phylum: Chordata
- Class: Actinopterygii
- Order: Characiformes
- Family: Anostomidae
- Subfamily: Leporininae
- Genus: Hypomasticus; Borodin, 1929

Type species
- Leporinus mormyrops Steindachner, 1875

= Hypomasticus =

Genus of fishes

Hypomasticus is a genus of freshwater ray-finned fishes belonging to the family Anostomidae, the toothed headstanders. These fishes are found in South America.

== Species ==
These are the currently recognized species in this genus:

- Hypomasticus arcus (C. H. Eigenmann, 1912)
- Hypomasticus copelandii (Steindachner, 1875)
- Hypomasticus despaxi (Puyo, 1943)
- Hypomasticus gomesi (Garavello & Santos, 1981)
- Hypomasticus granti (C. H. Eigenmann, 1912)
- Hypomasticus lebaili (Géry & Planquette, 1983)
- Hypomasticus lineomaculatus Birindelli, Peixoto, Wosiacki & Britski, 2013
- Hypomasticus megalepis (Günther, 1863)
- Hypomasticus melanostictus (Norman 1926)
- Hypomasticus mormyrops (Steindachner, 1875)
- Hypomasticus nijsseni (Garavello, 1990)
- Hypomasticus santanai Birindelli & Melo, 2020
- Hypomasticus santosi (Britski & Birindelli, 2013)
- Hypomasticus steindachneri (C. H. Eigenmann, 1907)
- Hypomasticus tepui (Birindelli, Britski & Provenzano, 2019)
- Hypomasticus thayeri (Borodin, 1929)
- Hypomasticus torrenticola (Birindelli, Teixeira & Britski, 2016)
