= Synodontis tanganyicae =

Conservation status
- Least Concern (IUCN 3.1)

Scientific classification
- Kingdom: Animalia
- Phylum: Chordata
- Class: Actinopterygii
- Order: Siluriformes
- Family: Mochokidae
- Genus: Synodontis
- Species: S. tanganyicae

Binomial name
- Synodontis tanganyicae Borodin, 1936

Synonyms
- Synodontis lacustricolus Poll, 1953

Species of fish

Synodontis tanganyicae is a species of upside-down catfish endemic to the Democratic Republic of the Congo, Zambia, and Tanzania, where it is only known from Lake Tanganyika. It was first described by Russian-American ichthyologist Nikolai Andreyevich Borodin in 1936, from specimens collected at Kasaga, in what is now the Democratic Republic of the Congo. The species name tanganyicae comes from the habitat of the species, Lake Tanganyika.

== Description ==
Like all members of the genus Synodontis, S. tanganyicae has a strong, bony head capsule that extends back as far as the first spine of the dorsal fin. The head contains a distinct narrow, bony, external protrusion called a humeral process. The shape and size of the humeral process helps to identify the species. In S. tanganyicae, the humeral process is wide, triangular, and rough in appearance; the bottom edge does not contain a ridge. The top edge is concave and ends in a blunt point.

The fish has three pairs of barbels. The maxillary barbels are on located on the upper jaw, and two pairs of mandibular barbels are on the lower jaw. The maxillary barbel has a well-developed membrane attached near the base and is straight without any branches. It extends at least as far as the base of the pectoral fin. The outer pair of mandibular barbels extends just short of the pectoral girdle, and contains four to seven branches without secondary branches. The inner pair of mandibular barbels is about 1/3 as long as the outer pair, with four to six branches, with secondary branches present.

The skin of S. tanganyicae has a large number of tiny vertical skin folds. The exact purpose of the skin folds is not known, but is a characteristic of the species of Syndontis that are endemic to Lake Tanganyika. External papilla are present but do not extend onto the fins.

The front edges of the dorsal fins and the pectoral fins of Syntontis species are hardened into stiff spines. In S. tanganyicae, the spine of the dorsal fin is long, nearly straight, and ends with short, dark filament. The remaining portion of the dorsal fin is made up of seven to eight branching rays. The spine of the pectoral fin is slightly curved, about as long as the dorsal fin spine, and ends in short, dark filament. The rest of the pectoral fins are made up of eight to nine branching rays. The adipose fin does not contain any rays, is long and well developed, and has a convex shape. The pelvic fin contains one unbranched and six branched rays. The anal fin contains three to five unbranched and seven to nine branched rays. The tail, or caudal fin, is forked, with slightly rounded lobes.

The mouth of the fish faces downward and has wide lips that contain papilla. All members of Syndontis have a structure called a premaxillary toothpad, which is located on the very front of the upper jaw of the mouth. This structure contains several rows of short, chisel-shaped teeth. In some species, this toothpad is made up of a large patch with several rows in a large cluster. In other species of Syndontis, this toothpad is clearly divided into two separate groups, separated by a thin band of skin that divides the toothpad. This character is used as a method of differentiating between two different but similar species of Syndontis. In S. tanganyicae, the toothpad is interrupted, with a distinct gap between groups of teeth. On the lower jaw, or mandible, the teeth of Syndontis are attached to flexible, stalk-like structures and described as "s-shaped" or "hooked". The number of teeth on the mandible is used to differentiate between species; in S. tanganyicae, there are 33 to 49 teeth on the mandible, arranged in a single row.

Some of the species of Synodontis have an opening or series of openings called the axillary pore. It is located on the sides of the body below the humeral process and before the pectoral fin spine. The exact function of the port is not known to scientists, although its presence has been observed in seven other catfish genera. Fish in the genus Acrochordonichthys are known to secrete a mucus with toxic properties from their axillary pore, but there is no scientific consensus as to the exact purpose of the secretion or the pore. S. tanganyicae does not have an axillary pore.

The body color is gray to reddish brown on the back, covered with large, scattered, small black spots. The underside is lighter, with smaller spots. Most of the species of Synodontis of Lake Tanganyika have a recognizable pattern consisting of dark triangles at the bases of all of the rayed fins, present in S. tanganyicae, and the back edges of the fins are whiter. The barbels are white.

The maximum standard length of known specimens is 49 centimetres (19 in) with a total length of 58.5 centimetres (23.0 in). Generally, females in the genus Synodontis tend to be slightly larger than males of the same age.

== Habitat and behavior ==
In the wild, the species is endemic to Lake Tanganyika, which has an observed temperature range of 22 to 26 °C (72 to 79 °F), an approximate pH of 8.5 – 9, and dH range of 4–15. The fish inhabits littoral to benthic zones over shell, sand, and mud bottoms, and has been found at depths of up to 130 metres (430 ft). The reproductive habits of most of the species of Synodontis are not known, beyond some instances of obtaining egg counts from gravid females. Spawning likely occurs during the flooding season between July and October, and pairs swim in unison during spawning. The diet consists of gastropods, lamellibranchs, insect larvae, ostracods, and shrimp. The growth rate is rapid in the first year, then slows down as the fish age.
