= Hypomasticus torrenticola =

Scientific classification
- Kingdom: Animalia
- Phylum: Chordata
- Class: Actinopterygii
- Order: Characiformes
- Family: Anostomidae
- Genus: Hypomasticus
- Species: H. torrenticola

Binomial name
- Hypomasticus torrenticola (Birindelli, Teixeira & Britski, 2016)

Synonyms
- Leporinus torrenticola Birindelli, Teixeira & Britski, 2016

Species of fish

Hypomasticus torrenticola is a species of freshwater ray-finned fish belonging to the family Anostomidae, the toothed headstanders. It is endemic to Brazil and found in the middle Xingu River and its two major tributaries, the Iriri and the Curuá, in Pará state.

== Description ==
Hypomasticus torrenticola can reach a standard length of 12.3 centimetres (4.8 in).
