= 2022 Caspian seal die-off =

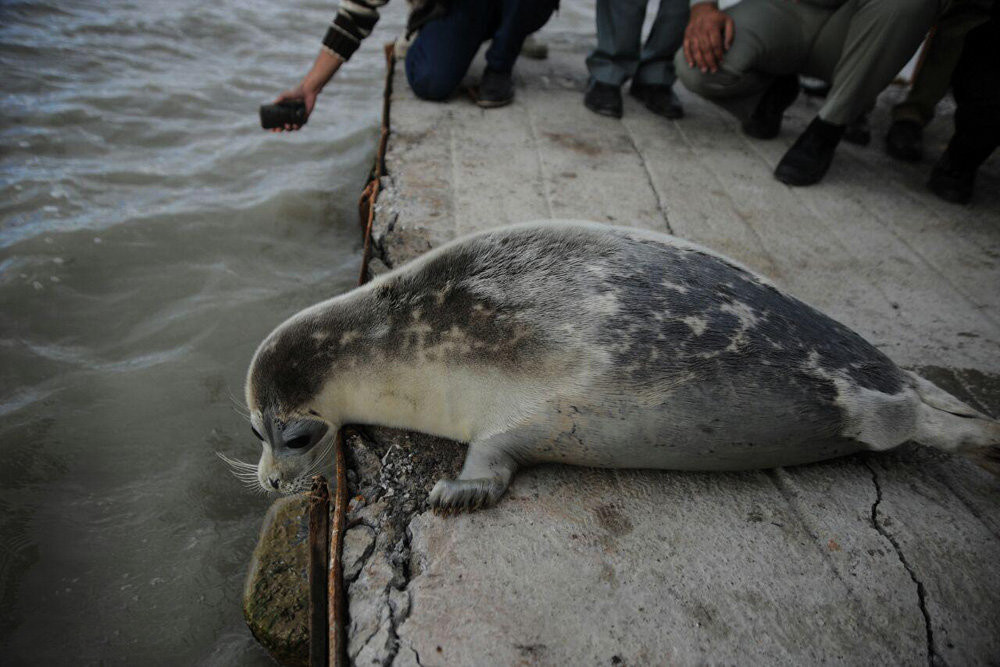
A Caspian seal

On 4 December 2022 a mass die-off of endangered Caspian seals (Pusa caspica) in the Caspian Sea was reported. Initially over 140 Caspian seals were found dead on the beaches of Kazakhstan. By 5 December around 2,500 dead Caspian seals have been found on Dagestan's shore. No conclusive cause of the die-off has been established. Dagestan's Ministry of Natural Resources believed the animals had died of "natural factors" and estimated the number of dead seals was likely to be much higher.

While Caspian seal is an IUCN-listed endangered species, Dagestan's Ministry of Natural Resources said their overall number in the area remained stable, "ranging from 270,000 to 300,000". Marine Mammal Protected Areas Task Force estimated the population at 168,000, whilst the Caspian Seals Research and Rehabilitation Center (CSRRC) put the number at fewer than 70,000. Since the beginning of the 1900s, the population has dropped by over 90%.

Initially it was reported that 700 dead seals had been found on the shore, but the Ministry of Natural Resources and Environment of Russia later revised the number to about 2,500.

== Causes ==
Dagestan's Ministry of Natural Resources said there were "no signs of violent death, no remains of fishing nets" and that judging by their appearance, the seals died about two weeks before their discovery (in November). Specialists from the Caspian Environmental Protection Center started to analyze samples from the dead seals to find the cause of death. No signs of pollutants were immediately found.

According to Russian journalist Yulia Latynina, the seals died because of toxic fuel of air-launched cruise missiles from Russian bombers Tu-95 and Tu-160 deployed over Caspian Sea in the 2022 Russian invasion of Ukraine. According to this version, some missiles malfunction due to their old age and fail to launch. To avoid their accidental falls on land, launches are made over water. Since the start of the invasion several mass die-offs of Caspian seals were recorded (such as in spring of 2022 when between 31 March and 2 May 832 carcasses were found in Kazakhstan's Mangystau Region and in summer when 837 carcasses were found on Kazakhstan's coast).
