= Hypomasticus santosi =

Conservation status
- Data Deficient (IUCN 3.1)

Scientific classification
- Kingdom: Animalia
- Phylum: Chordata
- Class: Actinopterygii
- Order: Characiformes
- Family: Anostomidae
- Genus: Hypomasticus
- Species: H. santosi

Binomial name
- Hypomasticus santosi (Britski & Birindelli, 2013)

Synonyms
- Leporinus santosi Britskii & Birindelli, 2013

Species of fish

Hypomasticus santosi is a species of freshwater ray-finned fish belonging to the family Anostomidae, the toothed headstanders. It is found in the lower Tocantins River in Pará state, Brazil.

== Description ==
Hypomasticus santosi can reach a standard length of 13.5 centimetres (5.3 in).

== Etymology ==
The species epithet is named in honor of Geraldo Mendes dos Santos, of the Instituto Nacional de Pesquisas da Amazônia in Manaus, for his contributions to the knowledge of the fish fauna of the lower Tocantins River due to his studies on anostomids and on the impacts of the Tucuruí Dam on the environment.
