= Hypomasticus gomesi =

Conservation status
- Near Threatened (IUCN 3.1)

Scientific classification
- Kingdom: Animalia
- Phylum: Chordata
- Class: Actinopterygii
- Order: Characiformes
- Family: Anostomidae
- Genus: Hypomasticus
- Species: H. gomesi

Binomial name
- Hypomasticus gomesi (Garavello & G. M. dos Santos, 1981)

Synonyms
- Leporinus gomesi Garavello & G. M. dos Santos, 1981; Leporinus gomesi Garavello & G. M. dos Santos, 1990

Species of fish

Hypomasticus gomesi is a species of anostomid fish. It is found in the Aripuanã River basin in Brazil.

== Description ==
Hypomasticus gomesi can reach a standard length of 16.0 centimetres (6.3 in).

== Etymology ==
The species epithet is named in honor of João Gomes da Silva, of the Universidade Federal de São Carlos, who collected the type specimen.
