= Freshwater tyulka =

Conservation status
- Least Concern (IUCN 3.1)

Scientific classification
- Kingdom: Animalia
- Phylum: Chordata
- Class: Actinopterygii
- Division: Teleostei
- Order: Clupeiformes
- Family: Ehiravidae
- Genus: Clupeonella
- Species: C. tscharchalensis

Binomial name
- Clupeonella tscharchalensis (Borodin, 1896)

Synonyms
- Clupea cultriventris tscharchalensis Borodin, 1896

Species of fish

The freshwater tyulka (Clupeonella tscharchalensis) is a species of fish in the herring family Clupeidae. It is found in the Caspian Sea watersheds, including the lower reaches of the rivers Volga and Ural. It was introduced to the Don River basin (Sea of Azov basin) and is also invasive upstream in the Volga drainage (Kama River). It is a small freshwater pelagic fish, up to 10 cm maximal length, inhabiting large lakes and reservoirs, and breeding in open water. Earlier it was considered to be a part of the species Clupeonella cultriventris (a variety or subspecies). But, the structure of the mitochondrial genome of "freshwater tyulka" from the freshwater Rybinsk Reservoir was homologous to that of the specimen from the Caspian Sea. An analysis of the nucleotide variability of the complete mitochondrial genome of freshwater and marine tyulkas does not provide grounds for dividing the species C. cultriventris into several independent taxa.
