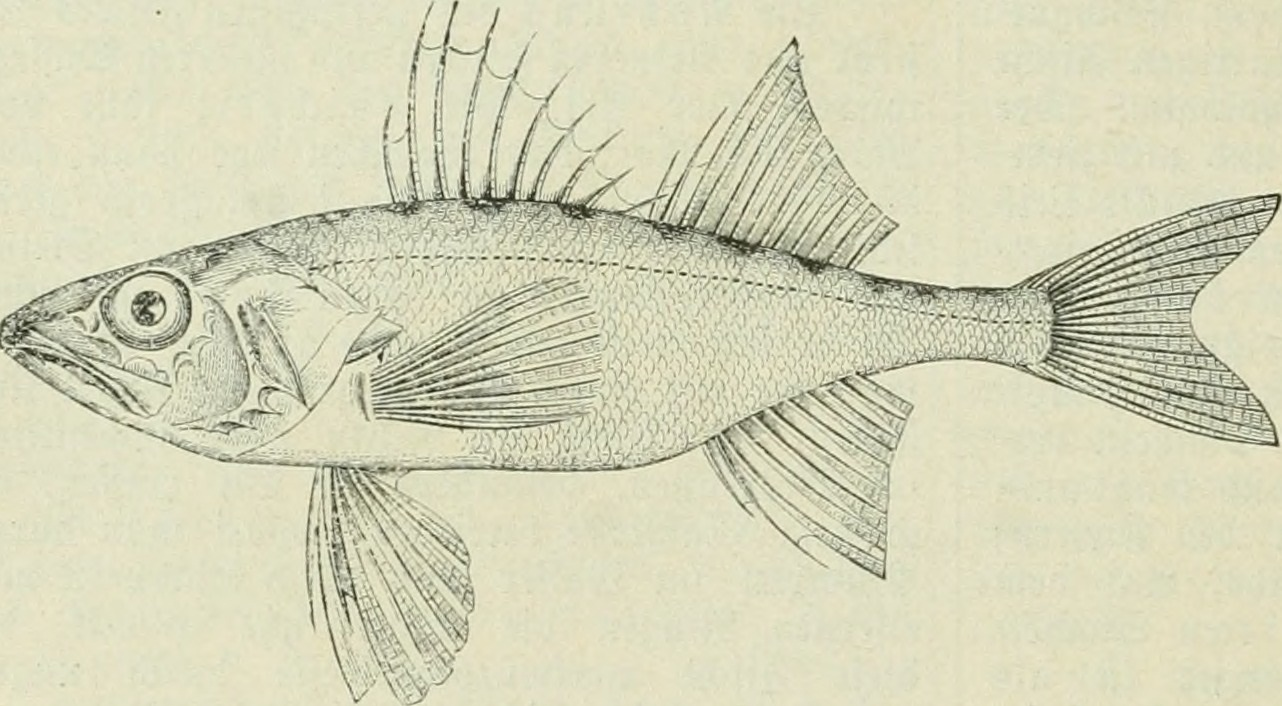

Scientific classification
- Domain: Eukaryota
- Kingdom: Animalia
- Phylum: Chordata
- Class: Actinopterygii
- Order: Perciformes
- Family: Percidae
- Subfamily: Percinae
- Genus: Percarina; Nordmann, 1840

Type species
- Percarina demidoffii Nordmann, 1840

= Percarina =

Genus of fishes

Percarina is a genus of ray-finned fish in the family Percidae found in eastern Europe. They are characterised by having the first dorsal fin, having 9–11 spines and being widely separated from the second dorsal fin.

Previously, they were treated as the only taxon in the monotypic subfamily Percarininae, but they are now placed with the perches and ruffes in the Percinae.

== Species ==
There are currently two recognised species in the genus:

- Percarina demidoffii Nordmann, 1840 (Common percarina)
- Percarina maeotica Kuznetsov, 1888 (Azov percarina)
