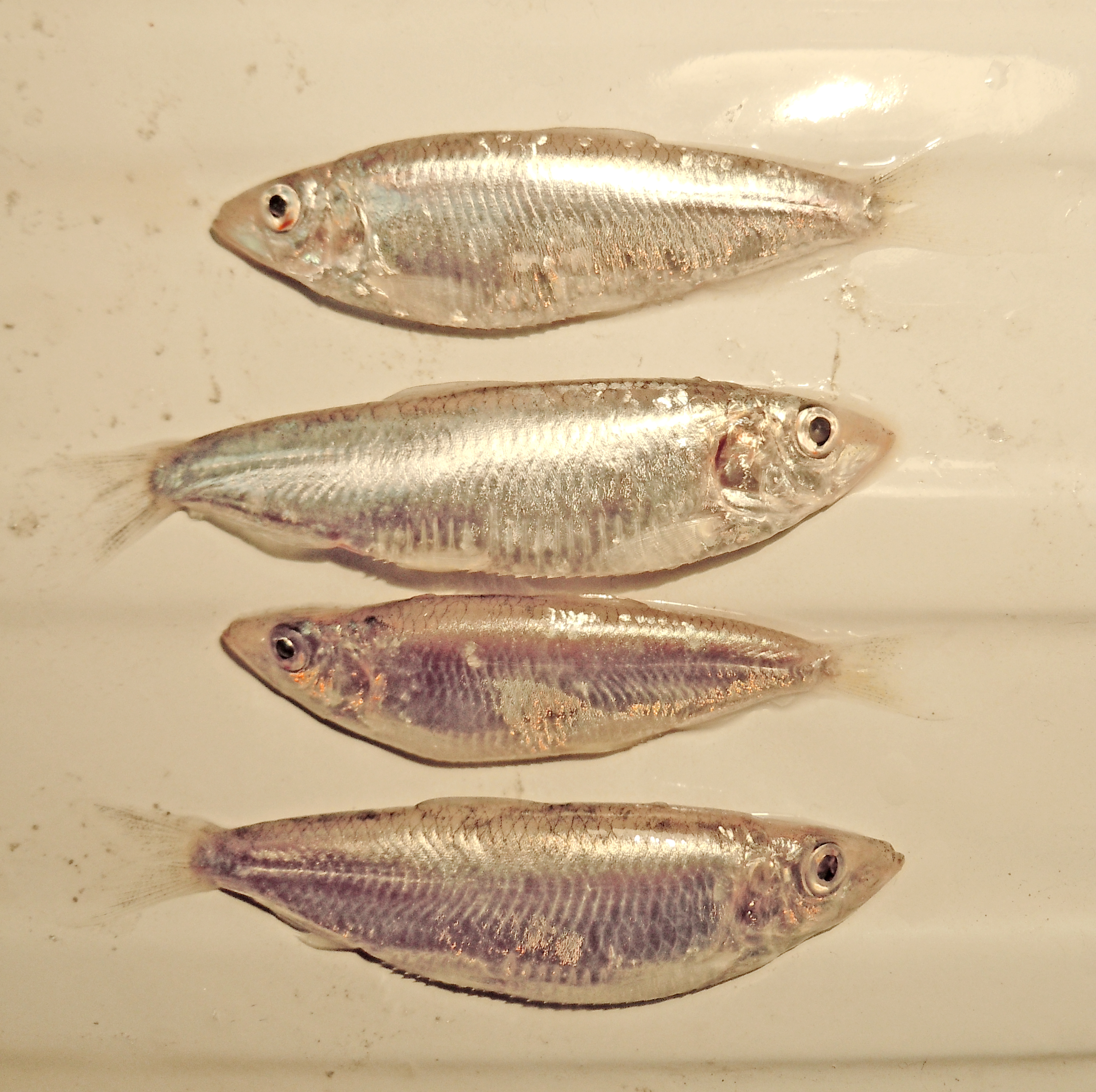
- Black Sea sprat (Clupeonella cultriventris)

Scientific classification
- Domain: Eukaryota
- Kingdom: Animalia
- Phylum: Chordata
- Class: Actinopterygii
- Order: Clupeiformes
- Suborder: Clupeoidei
- Family: Ehiravidae
- Genus: Clupeonella; Kessler, 1877

Type species
- Clupeonella grimmi Kessler, 1877

= Clupeonella =

Genus of fishes

Clupeonella is a genus of fish in the family Ehiravidae. They are widespread in the fresh and brackish waters of the Caspian Sea and Black drainages.

== Species ==
- Clupeonella abrau (Maliatsky, 1930) (Abrau sprat)
- Clupeonella caspia Svetovidov, 1941 (Caspian tyulka)
- Clupeonella cultriventris (Nordmann, 1840) (Black Sea sprat)
- Clupeonella engrauliformis (Borodin, 1904) (Anchovy sprat)
- Clupeonella grimmi Kessler, 1877 (Southern Caspian sprat)
- Clupeonella muhlisi Neu, 1934
- Clupeonella tscharchalensis (Borodin, 1896) (Freshwater tyulka)

== Sources ==
- Froese, Rainer; Pauly, Daniel (eds.). "Species in genus Clupeonella". FishBase. February 2015 version.
