= Natality in population ecology =

Natality in population ecology is the scientific term for birth rate. Along with mortality rate, natality rate is used to calculate the dynamics of a population. They are the key factors in determining whether a population is increasing, decreasing or staying the same in size. Natality is the greatest influence on a population's increase. Natality is shown as a crude birth rate or specific birth rate. Crude birth rate is used when calculating population size (number of births per 1000 population/year), whereas specific birth rate is used relative to a specific criterion such as age. By calculating specific birth rate, the results are seen in an age-specific schedule of births.

== Definitions ==
- Natality Rate – number of births per 1000 individuals per year.
- Absolute Natality – the number of births under ideal conditions (with no competition, abundance of resources such as food and water, etc.).
- Realized Natality – the number of births when environmental pressures come into play.

== Animal natality ==
Specific birth rate is used when calculating animal natality. The criterion used is age. Animal natality is expressed as an age-specific schedule of births. This is represented by the quantity of young/unit of time by females in various age classes. The age-specific birth schedule will count females that have only given birth to females. Showing the number of females that have been born relative to the previous generation will show how much of that generation may have the ability to reproduce. To construct the age-specific schedule, the average number of females born must be calculated. A survivorship column must also be included to construct a fertility table. Taking the survivorship column and the mx values from the life table, the number of offspring will be shown, giving us the natality rate.

=== Larger implications ===
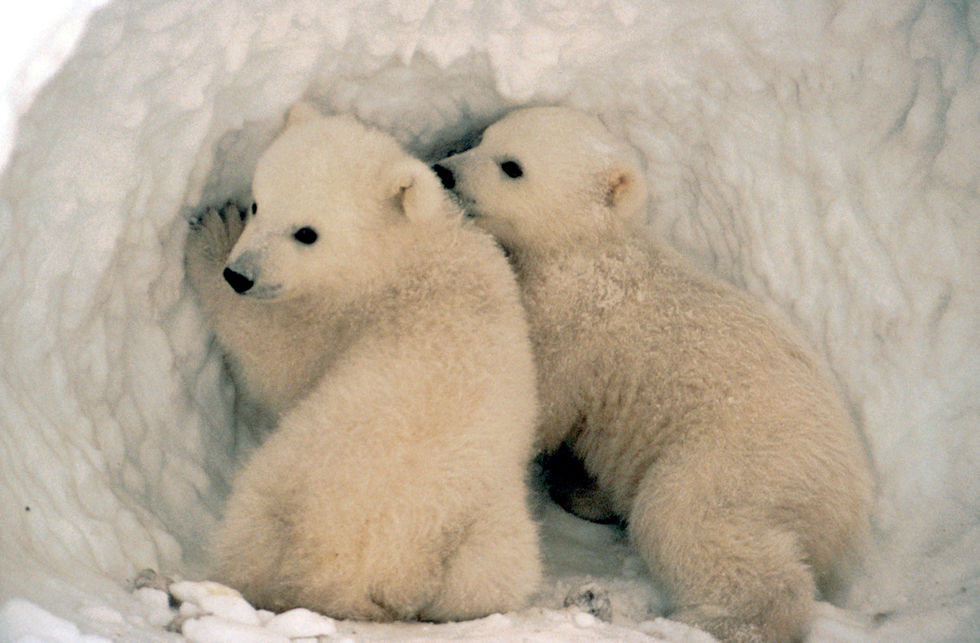
Calculating natality of animals such as these polar bear cubs can help with preservation efforts.

Calculating Natality for Animals has become an important part of the research for preservation of species. Studies have been conducted to determine whether a species may be going extinct because of climate or availability of resources. Measuring the natality of a species during extreme conditions such as drastic climate shift or a decrease in prey density will show scientists the measures that need to be taken to keep that species alive. Studies have been conducted about the Polar bear population in Svalbard, Norway from 1988 to 2002 (Derocher 2005). As the average adult ages of both female and male increased, the natality rate decreased. Due to this observation, there was an interest in discovering why. The study was able to correlate the density of ringed seals, which are the polar bears' main prey, to the low natality rates.

== Plant natality ==
Plants’ natality is more difficult to determine than animals. The factors that make it difficult to measure are:

- Seed production of individual plants varying year to year.
- Seed production will also vary age class to age class.
- The seeds will become dormant for long periods of time before germinating

Plant natality is an uncertain factor to measure. The time it takes for a plant to germinate its seeds may be extended over too long of a time period for accurate measurement.

== Natality in humans ==
Calculating and concluding the natality rate of humans is similar to animals. Age-specific schedules are constructed when determining growth rate. It can be used to find the effects that environmental chemicals/toxins have on women of a childbearing age (Axelrad 2010). Birth rates are helpful in making government policies regarding population growth. The birth rate is an item of concern and policy for a number of national governments. Some, including those of Italy and Malaysia, seek to increase the national birth rate using measures such as financial incentives or provision of support services to new mothers. Conversely, other countries have policies to reduce the birth rate, for example, China's one child policy. Measures such as improved information about and availability of birth control have achieved similar results in countries such as Iran.

== Calculations where natality is a factor ==
- Natality rate: number of births/unit of time/Average Population
- For wildlife management: N1 = N0 + (B − D) + (I − E) Where:
  - N1 = number of individuals at time 1
  - N0 = number of individuals at time 0
  - B = number of individuals born
  - D = number of individuals that died
  - I = number of individuals that immigrated
  - E = number of individuals that emigrated between time 0 and time 1.
- Intrinsic rate of increase: (dN/dt)(1/N) = r
  - r= intrinsic rate of increase
  - (dN/dt) = rate that population increases
  - N = population size
