= Caspian tyulka =

Conservation status
- Least Concern (IUCN 3.1)

Scientific classification
- Kingdom: Animalia
- Phylum: Chordata
- Class: Actinopterygii
- Order: Clupeiformes
- Family: Ehiravidae
- Genus: Clupeonella
- Species: C. caspia

Binomial name
- Clupeonella caspia Svetovidov (ru), 1941

Synonyms
- Clupeonella cultiventris caspia Svetovidov, 1941; Clupeonella delicatula caspia Svetovidov, 1941

Species of fish

Caspian tyulka, Clupeonella caspia, is a species of fish in the family Clupeidae. It is found in the Caspian Sea, also in the lower reaches of the rivers Volga, Ural, and possibly Terek. This is a brackishwater pelagic-neritic fish, up to 12 cm maximum length.

Previously the Caspian tyulka was considered to be a part of the more widespread Clupeonella cultriventris (subspecies C. cultriventris caspia), but that species is now thought to inhabit the Pontic basin only.
