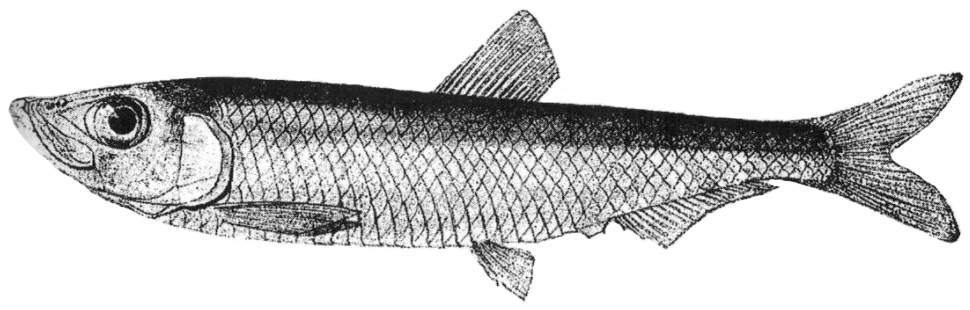

Conservation status
- Critically Endangered (IUCN 3.1)

Scientific classification
- Kingdom: Animalia
- Phylum: Chordata
- Class: Actinopterygii
- Order: Clupeiformes
- Family: Ehiravidae
- Genus: Clupeonella
- Species: C. abrau

Binomial name
- Clupeonella abrau (Maliatsky, 1930)

Synonyms
- Harengula abrau Maliatsky, 1930; Clupeonella abrau abrau (Maliatsky, 1930); Clupeonella muhlisi (non Neu, 1934)

= Abrau sprat =

Species of fish

The Abrau sprat (Clupeonella abrau) is a species of freshwater fish in the family Clupeidae. It is found landlocked in Russia in a single locality, Lake Abrau, located at 70 m above sea level near the Black Sea coast close to Novorossiysk. The lake is small and has been stocked by several alien species, whence the Abrau sprat is considered critically endangered. As a result of the 2019 expedition, several individuals of the Abrau sprat were caught and their mitocondrial genome were sequenced, which showed their identity with the museum specimens. This confirmed that the C. abrau is present in the fish community and is capable of reproducing in the Lake Abrau.

A sprat of the Lake Apolyont in Turkey, linked to the Sea of Marmara, was earlier treated as a subspecies of the Abrau sprat, Clupeonella abrau muhilisi, but has more recently been considered an independent species Clupeonella muhlisi.
