= Nikolai Andreyevich Borodin =

Russian-born American ichthyologist

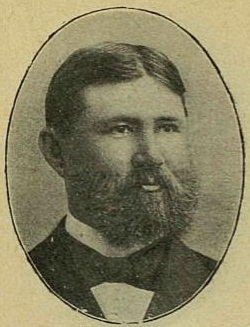
- Deputy of the First State Duma, 1906
- Born: November 23, 1861; Uralsk, Russian Empire
- Died: December 22, 1937; Cambridge, Massachusetts, United States
- Citizenship: Russian Empire; United States
- Education: Saint Petersburg University
- Known for: Ichthyological research, artificial sturgeon breeding, fishery reform
- Scientific career
- Fields: Ichthyology
- Workplaces: Harvard University

Signature
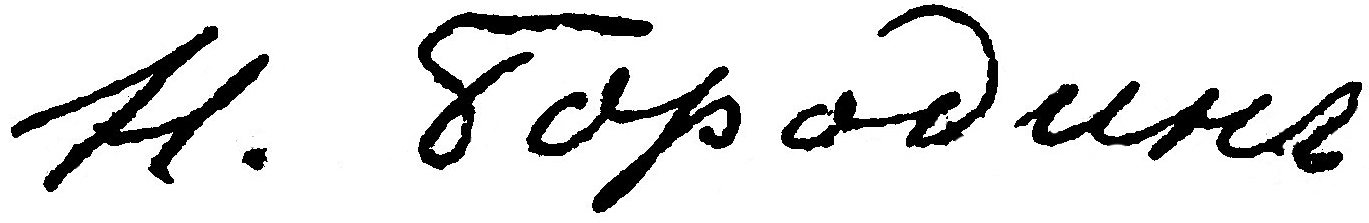

Nikolai Andreyevich Borodin (Russian: Никола́й Андре́евич Бороди́н; also Nicholas A. Borodin; 23 November 1861 – 22 December 1937) was a Russian ichthyologist, politician, and journalist. He served as a deputy of the First State Duma of the Russian Empire representing the Ural Oblast, was a member of the Constitutional Democratic Party, and later became a professor at Harvard University.

== Biography ==
Borodin was born into the family of a centurion (later a yesaul) of the Ural Cossack Host.

In 1870 he entered the Ural Military Gymnasium, graduating with a gold medal in 1879. He was admitted to the Faculty of Physics and Mathematics of Saint Petersburg University, first studying mathematics (1879–1880) and later switching to natural sciences (from September 1880). He graduated from the natural sciences department in December 1884.

Returning to Uralsk in 1885, he served as a clerk in the military economic administration.

=== Scientific work ===
With the support of Nikolai Shipov, the ataman of the Ural Cossack Host, Borodin began ichthyological studies of the Ural River in the 1880s. In 1884 he carried out the first successful artificial fertilization of sturgeon eggs in Russia (specifically sevruga).

In 1889, during the First All-Russian Fisheries Exhibition in St. Petersburg, he served as a guide for Emperor Alexander III. He conducted extensive statistical research and compiled the two-volume work The Ural Cossack Host: A Statistical Description (1891), awarded a gold medal by the Imperial Russian Geographical Society.

From 1891 to 1893 Borodin studied fisheries in Europe and North America and held the post of “military technician of Ural fisheries”. His experiments on artificial sturgeon fertilization and fish farming laid the foundation for modern aquaculture.

In 1899 he moved to Saint Petersburg and worked as a senior fisheries expert for the Ministry of Agriculture. He served as secretary-general of the International Congress on Fisheries (1902) and published numerous studies on Caspian and Black Sea fisheries.

=== Journalism ===
From 1894 Borodin contributed to Russkie Vedomosti. He founded and edited the newspapers Uralets, Ural Review, and Cossack Herald (1901–1904). He also worked for Our Life, contributed to the Brockhaus and Efron Encyclopedic Dictionary, and edited sections on fisheries in several technical journals.

=== Political activity ===
As a student Borodin joined the social-democratic group of D. Blagoyev in 1883 and was briefly arrested in 1886 for revolutionary activities. Later, he founded educational and social organizations in Uralsk.

==== In the State Duma ====
On 22 April 1906 he was elected to the First State Duma of the Russian Empire as a member of the Constitutional Democratic Party. He signed the Vyborg Manifesto and was sentenced to three months in prison, losing his right to stand for election.

=== Later years and emigration ===
After the Russian Revolution of 1917 Borodin emigrated to the United States in 1919, teaching at the Russian People's University in New York. From 1928 he served as curator of ichthyology at the Museum of Comparative Zoology at Harvard University, becoming a professor in 1931.

== Personal life ==
He married Lidia Semyonovna Donskova (born 1860s), who was a mathematician and librarian. They had a son and a daughter. Dmitry Borodin (1887–1957) was entomologist. Tatyana Borodina (1898–1937) was architect and was executed in Leningrad during the Great Purge.

He died in Cambridge, Massachusetts, in 1937.

== Species described ==
- Clupeonella tscharchalensis Borodin, 1896
- Acipenser persicus Borodin, 1897
- Clupeonella engrauliformis Borodin, 1904
- Alosa braschnikowi Borodin, 1904
- Cirripectes obscurus Borodin, 1927
- Chasmocranus truncatorostris Borodin, 1927
- Trachelyopterus leopardinus Borodin, 1927
- Lestidium atlanticum Borodin, 1928
- Hypomasticus garmani Borodin, 1929
- Synodontis tanganyicae Borodin, 1936

== Selected works ==
- Statistical Atlas of the Ural Cossack Host. Uralsk, 1885.
- Fisheries in Western Europe and North America. St. Petersburg, 1898–1900.
- The Caspian Herring and Its Fisheries. St. Petersburg, 1908.
- The Ural Cossacks and Their Fisheries. N.Y., Appleton & Co.
- Ideals and Reality: Forty Years of the Life and Work of an Ordinary Russian Intellectual (1879–1919). Berlin–Paris, 1930.
