= Southern Caspian sprat =

Scientific classification
- Kingdom: Animalia
- Phylum: Chordata
- Class: Actinopterygii
- Order: Clupeiformes
- Family: Ehiravidae
- Genus: Clupeonella
- Species: C. grimmi

Binomial name
- Clupeonella grimmi Kessler, 1877

Synonyms
- Harengula macrophthalma Knipovich, 1921

Species of fish

Southern Caspian sprat, Clupeonella grimmi, is a species of fish in the family Clupeidae. It is found in the brackishwater Caspian Sea, in its central and southern parts in the pelagic zone. It is a small fish, typically 11 cm length, and up to 14.5 cm maximum. Occurs not deeper that 32 m depth.

== Sources ==
- Clupeonella grimmi at FishBase
