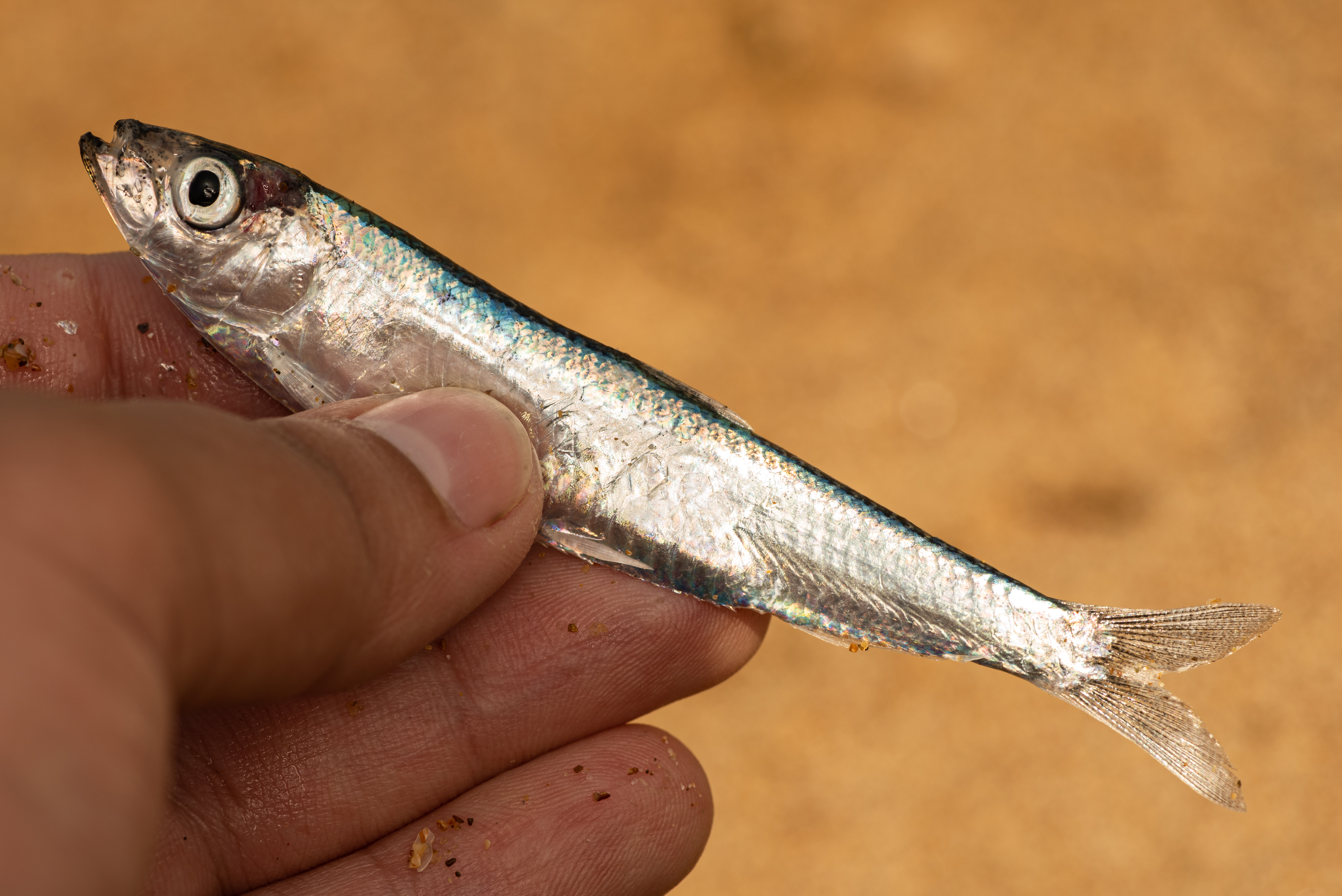

Scientific classification
- Kingdom: Animalia
- Phylum: Chordata
- Class: Actinopterygii
- Order: Clupeiformes
- Family: Ehiravidae
- Genus: Clupeonella
- Species: C. engrauliformis

Binomial name
- Clupeonella engrauliformis (Borodin, 1904)

Synonyms
- Clupea engrauliformis Borodin, 1904

= Anchovy sprat =

Species of fish

Anchovy sprat, Clupeonella engrauliformis, is a species of fish in the family Clupeidae. It is one of several species of Clupeonella found in the Central and Southern Caspian Sea. It lives pelagically in the central and southern parts of this brackishwater lake. It is typically 12 cm (4.7 in) long, and up to 16.5 cm (6.5 in) maximum. It may be found down to a depth of 78 m (256 ft).

The achovy sprat was first described by ichthyologist N. A. Borodin in 1904 under the name Clupea engrauliformis. The holotype is 124 mm in length, was caught near Cape Buynak in the Caspian Sea and is stored in the Zoological Institute of the Russian Academy of Sciences.

== Description ==
The maximum body length is 16.5 cm, with a mass up to 26 g.

The body of the fish is elongated and low, with its height comprising 16-19% of the body length. The scales easily fall off. Its head is short and wide, with the interorbital distance being 16-18% of the body length and a small mouth. The abdomen of the achovy sprat is rounded with a keel, in which there are 23-31 keeled scales. There are 56-67 gill rakers. the dorsal fin has 13-21 soft rays with the first three being unbranched. the anal fin has 18-22 soft rays with the first three also unbranched. The tail fin is almost black and strongly notched. The edges of the pectoral fins are pointed. The back is dark with a greenish tint. Females are usually slightly larger than males.

== Biology ==
The achovy sprat is a schooling pelagic fish that mainly inhabits open waters but occasionally approaches shores. In spring and autumn it rises to the surface, though most of the year is spent at depths up to 78 metres. It is found at water temperatures from 6 to 28 °С and salinity of 8-13%. It performs daily vertical and seasonal migrations. The difference between the mitochondrial genomes of anchovy and Black and Caspian Sea sprats concerns 449 bp (2.7%), including two insertions in the control region, unknown in other representatives of the genus Clupeonella. The differentiation of tyulkas is probably related to the transgression and degradation of the Pontic Lake-Sea: it began in the Miocene, continued in the Pliocene, and was completed by the Pleistocene. The modern differences of tyulkas may be connected with different adaptations of their ancestors to specific conditions in different water bodies—remnants of the Pontic Mega-lake.

=== Diet ===
The basis of its diet consists of copepods, and it feeds on zooplankton during the daytime, especially Eurytemora grimmi. To a lesser extent it consumes cladocerans, mysids and mollusk larvae.

Its natural enemies are Brazhnikov's shad (Alosa braschnikowi), Caspian seal and sturgeons.

=== Reproduction ===
It spawns in the open sea at depths greater than 20 m in the upper layers of water. Spawning is partial, stretching from May to November. Fecundity is from 10 to 55 thousand eggs. Eggs have a fat drop, pelagic. The larval stage continues until the spring of the year following spawning.

== Relationship with humans ==
=== Fishing ===
They are caught by light. Catches in the mid-1970s reached 350 thousand tons. It is used for the preparation of canned food, preserves and for spicy salting. Most of the raw material is used to make fish meal.

== Gallery ==
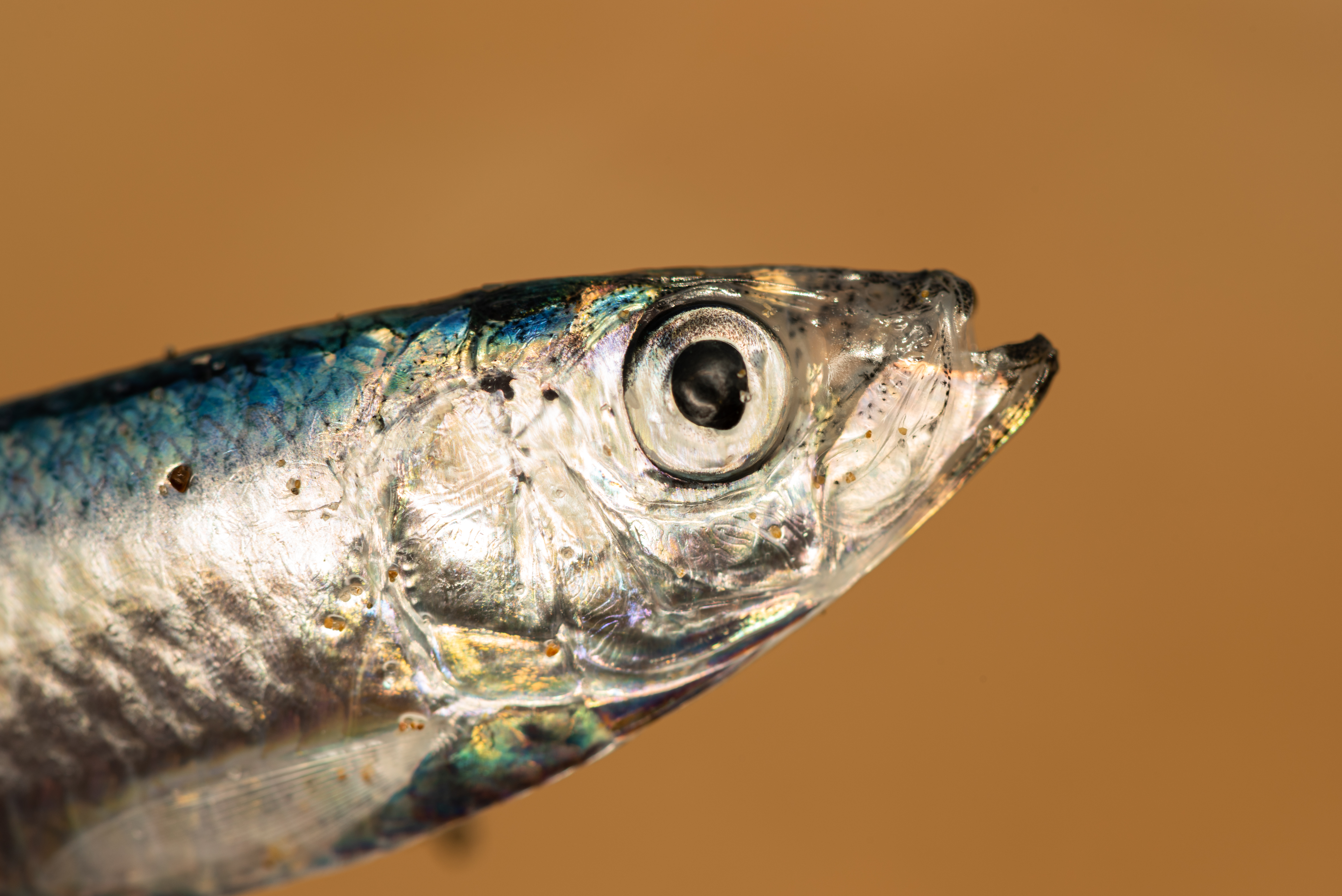

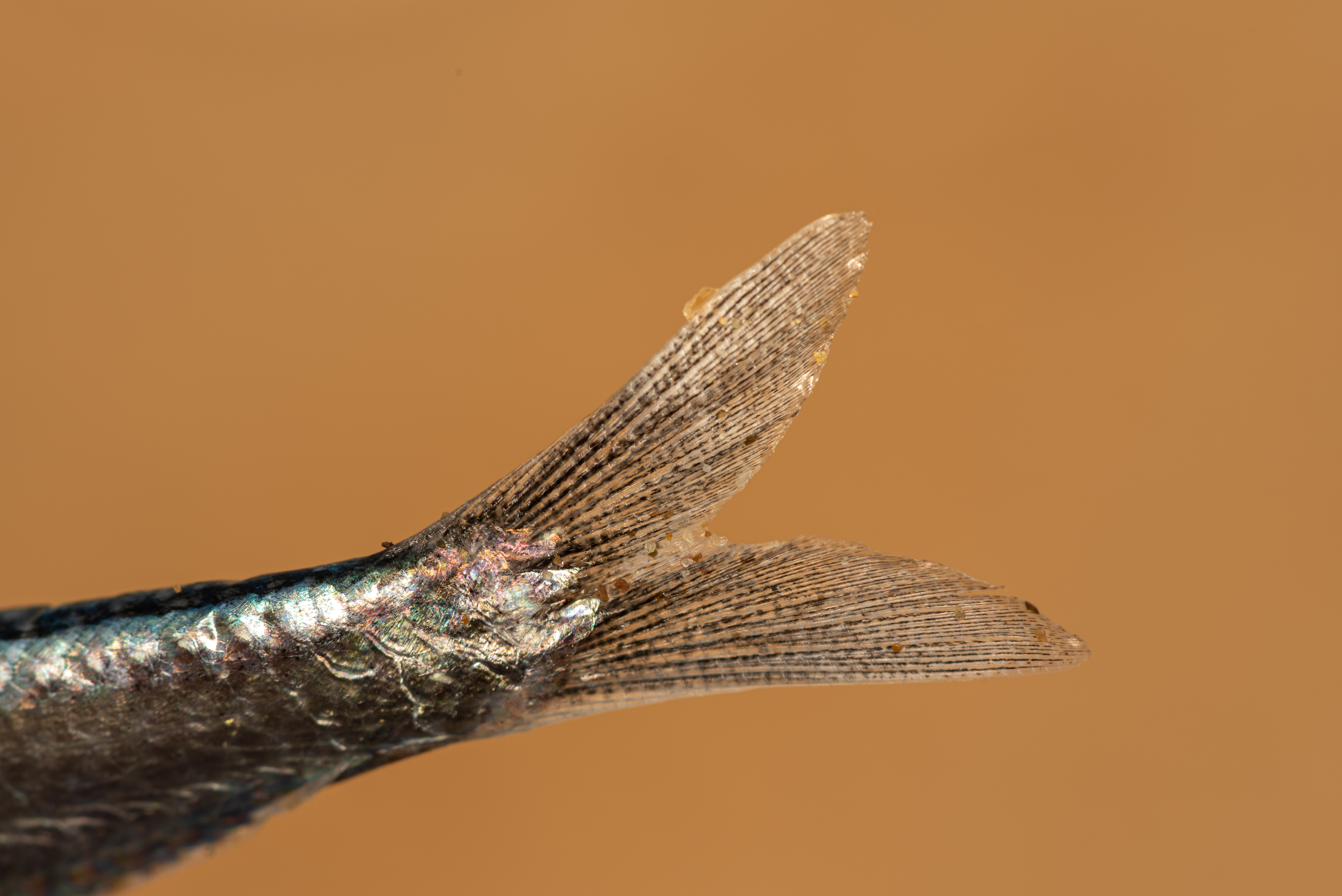
