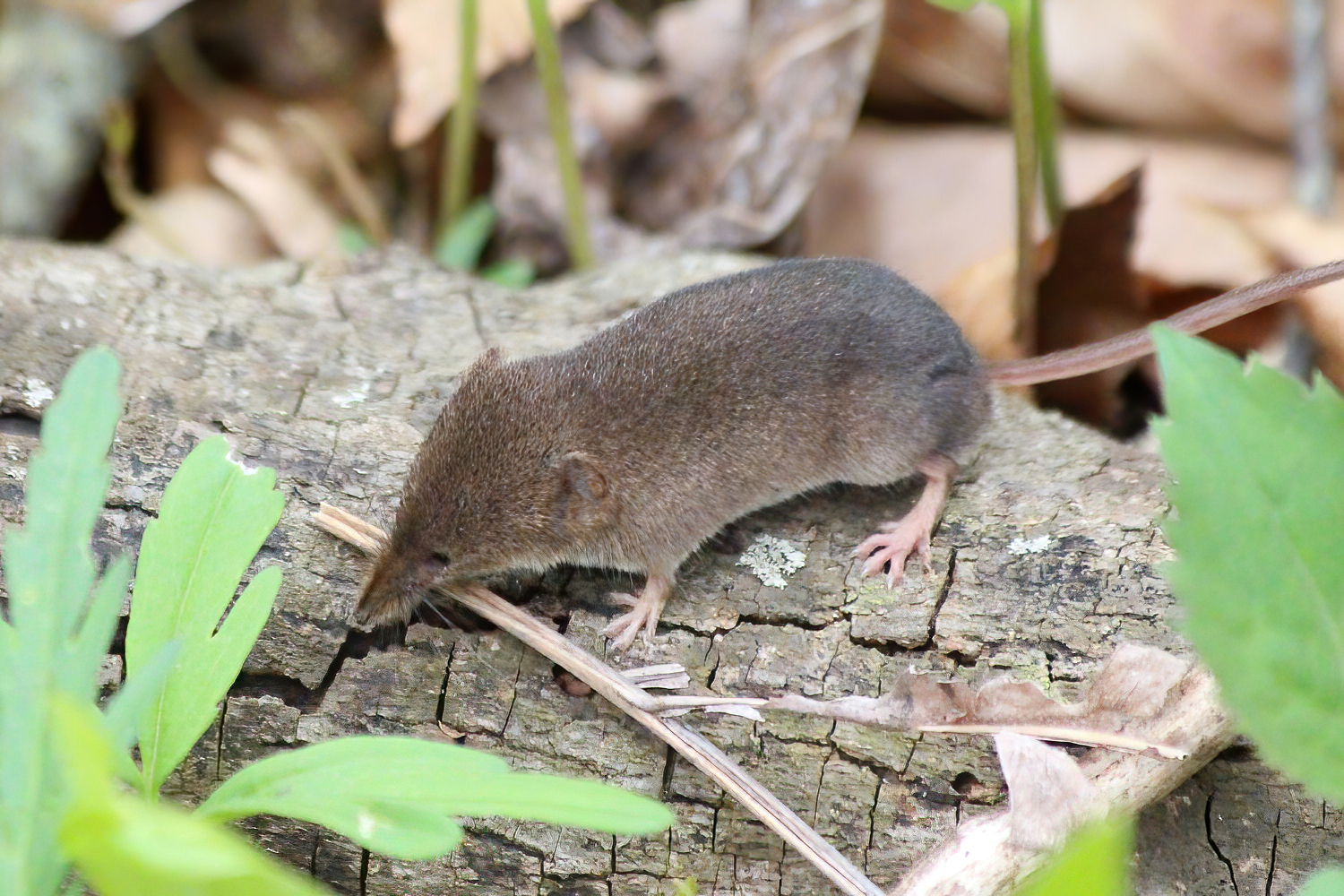

Conservation status
- Least Concern (IUCN 3.1)

- Secure (NatureServe)

Scientific classification
- Kingdom: Animalia
- Phylum: Chordata
- Class: Mammalia
- Order: Eulipotyphla
- Family: Soricidae
- Genus: Sorex
- Species: S. cinereus

Binomial name
- Sorex cinereus Kerr, 1792
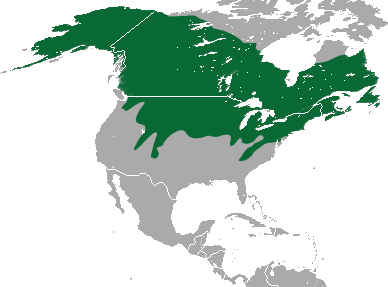
- Cinereus shrew range

= Cinereus shrew =

Species of mammal

The cinereus shrew or masked shrew (Sorex cinereus) is a small shrew found in Alaska, Canada, and the northern United States. This is the most widely distributed shrew in North America, where it is also known as the common shrew.

== Description ==
It is grey-brown in colour with a light grey underside and a pointed snout. It has a long tail that is brown on top and pale underneath with a dark tip. Its body is about 9 cm (3.5 in) in length including a 4 cm (1.6 in) long tail. It weighs about 5 g (0.18 oz). It has darker colouring than other shrews. Masked shrews can live up to two years, but, on average, only survive eighteen months.

In a long-term study done in Alaska, Yom-Tov and colleagues (2005) found that the masked shrew's body size contradicts Bergmann's rule. The study, done on 650 specimens and spanning from 1950 to 2003, examined body size in relation to ambient temperature. Measurements of body weight and the length of the tail, ear, hind foot, and body were taken. Results yielded that the masked shrew's body size decreased with high latitudes and with lower mean January temperatures, a trend that opposed Bergmann's Rule. It was suggested that this may be a coping mechanism to limit total energy requirements due to decreased food availability in winter months. Additionally, it was shown that body and tail length increased with rising temperatures during the second half of the twentieth century. This may be due to higher temperatures increasing the availability of the shrew's main diet.

== Distribution ==
The masked shrew is the most widely distributed shrew. Its range covers most of northern North America extending south as far down to Maryland, along the Rocky Mountains in the west, and to the Appalachians in the east. This species was introduced into Newfoundland in the late 1950s. It can be found in many types of habitat like arid grasslands, moist areas, woodland, and tundra. The masked shrew mostly lives in humid areas and with high levels of vegetation to hide in. Moisture determines the abundance of this shrew.

== Predation and parasitism ==
Predators include larger shrews, hawks, owls, shrikes, snakes, herons, foxes, leopard frogs, bluebirds, brown trout, and weasels. Masked shrews are susceptible to many types of parasites, like fleas and tapeworms. Cowan and colleagues (2007) found that the high volume of food masked shrews consume causes them to be more susceptible to parasitism. Since males have larger ranges, they have a higher exposure to parasites.

== Diet and prey ==
Masked shrews are opportunistic generalists. They eat insects, worms, snails, small rodents, salamanders, and seeds. Due to its high metabolism, the masked shrew can eat three times its weight a day. The shrew has to eat almost constantly, because they can only survive a few hours without food. Their metabolism drops when they are at rest.

McCay and colleagues (1997) found a higher abundance of masked shrews in non-irrigated forests due to a higher availability of larval insects, which is the preferred food source of the masked shrew. Masked shrews chose Lepidoptera larva over other food sources.

== Behavior ==
This animal is active day and night year-round. Masked shrews can be nocturnal or diurnal depending on the weather. Doucet and colleagues (1974) showed that rain increases the nocturnal activity of the masked shrew, while cloud cover increases day and night activity. It digs tunnels but also uses tunnels created by other small mammals. It uses dry grass to make nests in these tunnels. It can make high frequency pulses and has lateral scent glands. The home range of the masked shrew depends on availability of food, but it is on average 0.55 hectare. It has a low tolerance for other shrews in its home range. Merritt and colleagues (1995) found that its mass declined by half from summer to winter and non-shivering heat production, energy conservation, and reduced body mass.

== Reproduction ==
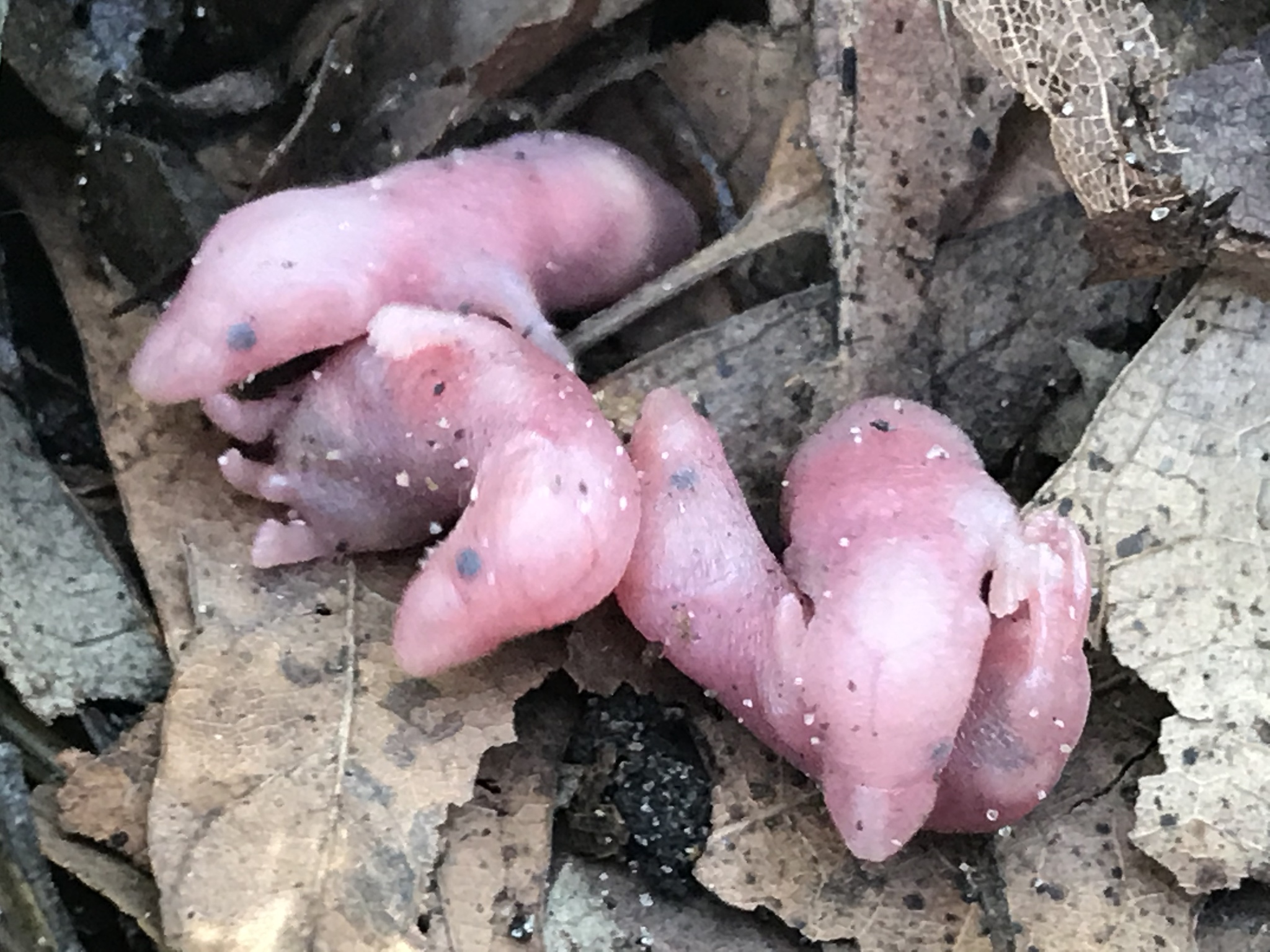
A litter of four newborn masked shrews

Masked shrews living at high latitudes are born in late spring and summer, reach adult size by the time they leave their nests, and complete their life cycle within a year. They are born during spring or summer, remain immature in winter, and breed the following spring. Masked shrews breed from May to September. Females have one litter of 6 to 7 young during the breeding season. The young are born hairless and clawless and have translucent abdominal walls. Body mass increases and peaks at twenty days, then decreases when the young leave the nest after about 27 days. Masked shrews have a high chance of mortality during their first two months of life and most die during the first year. Masked shrews become sexually mature at two months, but wait until their first spring to breed.

== Sources ==
- Cowan, Krystyna M.; Shutler, Dave; Herman, Thomas B.; Stewart, Donald T. (December 2007). "Extreme Male-biased Infections of Masked Shrews by Bladder Nematodes". Journal of Mammalogy. 88 (6): 1539–1543. doi:10.1644/06-MAMM-A-398R1.1. S2CID 55469401.
- Doucet, G. Jean; Bider, J. Roger (1974). "The Effects of Weather on the Activity of the Masked Shrew". Journal of Mammalogy. 55 (2): 348–363. doi:10.2307/1379003. JSTOR 1379003.
- Hutterer, R. (16 November 2005). Wilson, Don E., and Reeder, DeeAnn M.. ed. Mammal Species of the World (3rd ed.). Baltimore: Johns Hopkins University Press, 2 vols. (2142 pp.). pp. 286. ISBN 978-0-8018-8221-0. OCLC 62265494
- Lee, Wendy (2001). "Sorex cinereus (cinereus shrew)". Animal Diversity Web.
- McCay, Timothy S.; Storm, Gerald L. (1997). "Masked Shrew (Sorex cinereus) Abundance, Diet and Prey Selection in an Irrigated Forest". The American Midland Naturalist. 138 (2): 268–275. doi:10.2307/2426820. JSTOR 2426820.
- Merritt, Joseph F. (1995). "Seasonal Thermogenesis and Changes in Body Mass of Masked Shrews, Sorex cinereus". Journal of Mammalogy. 76 (4): 1020–1035. doi:10.2307/1382596. JSTOR 1382596.
- Whitaker, John O. (July 2004). "Sorex cinereus". Mammalian Species. 2004 (743): 1–9. doi:10.1644/1545-1410(2004)743<0001:SC>2.0.CO;2. S2CID 198969068.
- Yom-Tov, Yoram; Yom-Tov, Jonathan (September 2005). "Global warming, Bergmann's rule and body size in the masked shrew Sorex cinereus Kerr in Alaska". Journal of Animal Ecology. 74 (5): 803–808. Bibcode:2005JAnEc..74..803Y. doi:10.1111/j.1365-2656.2005.00976.x.
