= Saint Lawrence Island shrew =

Conservation status
- Least Concern (IUCN 3.1)

- Apparently Secure (NatureServe)

Scientific classification
- Kingdom: Animalia
- Phylum: Chordata
- Class: Mammalia
- Order: Eulipotyphla
- Family: Soricidae
- Genus: Sorex
- Species: S. jacksoni

Binomial name
- Sorex jacksoni Hall & Gilmore, 1932
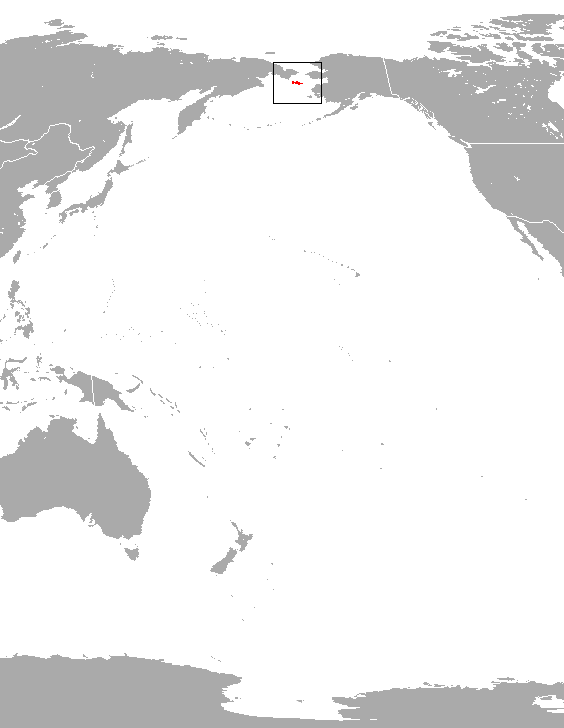
- Saint Lawrence Island shrew range
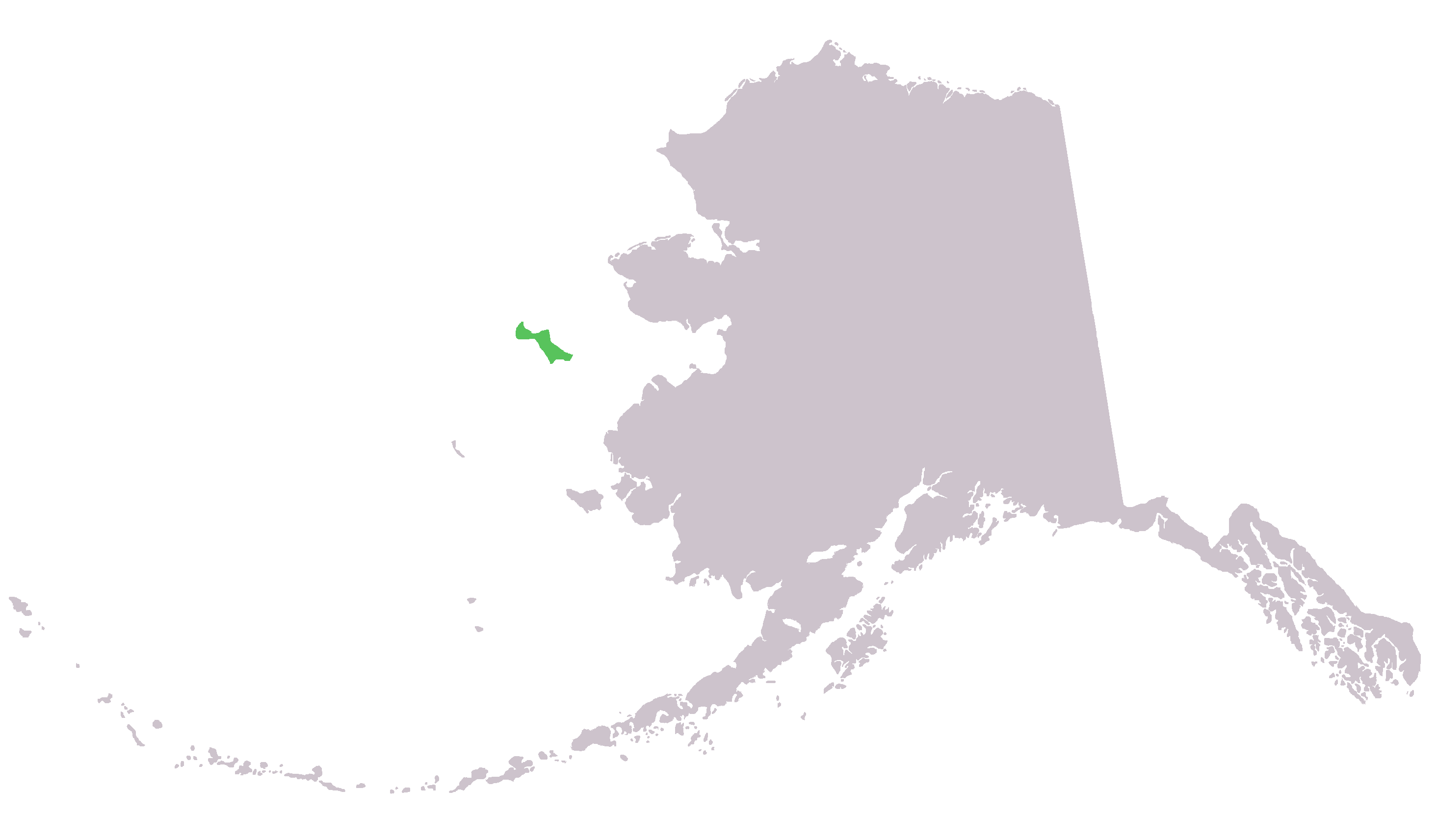
- Sorex jacksoni range

Species of mammal

The Saint Lawrence Island shrew (Sorex jacksoni) is a species of mammal in the family Soricidae. It is found only on Alaska's St. Lawrence Island.
