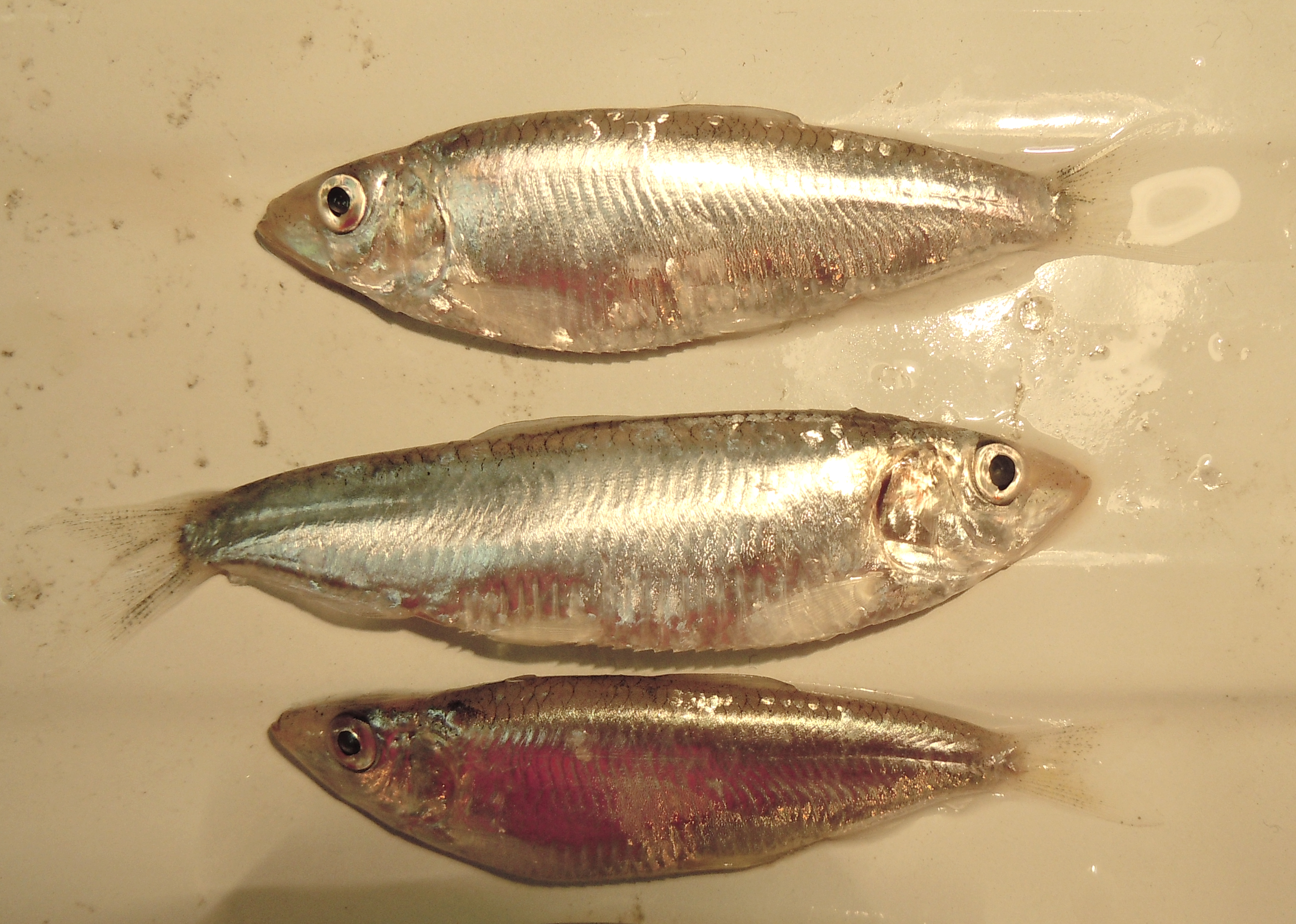

Conservation status
- Least Concern (IUCN 3.1)

Scientific classification
- Kingdom: Animalia
- Phylum: Chordata
- Class: Actinopterygii
- Division: Teleostei
- Order: Clupeiformes
- Family: Ehiravidae
- Genus: Clupeonella
- Species: C. cultriventris

Binomial name
- Clupeonella cultriventris (Nordmann, 1840)

Synonyms
- Clupea cultriventris Nordmann, 1840; Clupea cultriventris tscharchalensis (non Borodin, 1896); Clupea delicatula Nordmann, 1840; Clupeonella cultiventris (Nordmann, 1840); Clupeonella delicatula (Nordmann, 1840); Clupeonella delicatula azovi Vladimirov, 1950; Clupeonella delicatula caspia (non Svetovidov, 1941); Clupeonella delicatula cultriventris (Nordmann, 1840)

= Black Sea sprat =

Species of fish

Global capture production of Black and Caspian Sea sprat (Clupeonella cultriventris) in thousand tonnes from 1950 to 2022, as reported by the FAO

The Black Sea sprat or Pontic sprat, Clupeonella cultriventris, is a small fish of the herring family, Clupeidae. It is found in the Black Sea and Sea of Azov and rivers of its basins: Danube, Dnister, Dnipro (Ukraine), Southern Bug, Don, Kuban. It has white-grey flesh and silver-grey scales. A typical size is 10 cm (3.9 in), maximum 15 cm (5.9 in). The life span is up to 5 years. The peak of its spawning is in April and it can be found in enormous shoals in sea-shores, filled all-round coastal shallows, moving quickly back into the sea at a depth of 6–30 metres (20–98 ft). Used for food; it has around 12% fat in flesh.

It is one of the most abundant fishes in the Sea of Azov. It is important prey for other fishes, particularly the pikeperch.

The Clupeonella cultiventris has become a naturalized and often dominant species in the pelagic zones of the Volga and Kama River reservoirs. It exhibits long-term (6–8 year) population cycles, particularly in the Upper Volga. The northernmost point of its self-sustaining population in the Volga-Kama region is the Sheksna Reservoir, with single mature individuals occasionally recorded even further north in Lake Beloye.

The Caspian tyulka Clupeonella caspia has been long considered a subspecies of C. cultriventris, C. cultriventris caspia, and a common name "Black and Caspian Sea sprat" was then applied to the whole.

In Odesa cuisine, the sprats are battered and fried to produce sprat cutlets.

Sprat cutlets

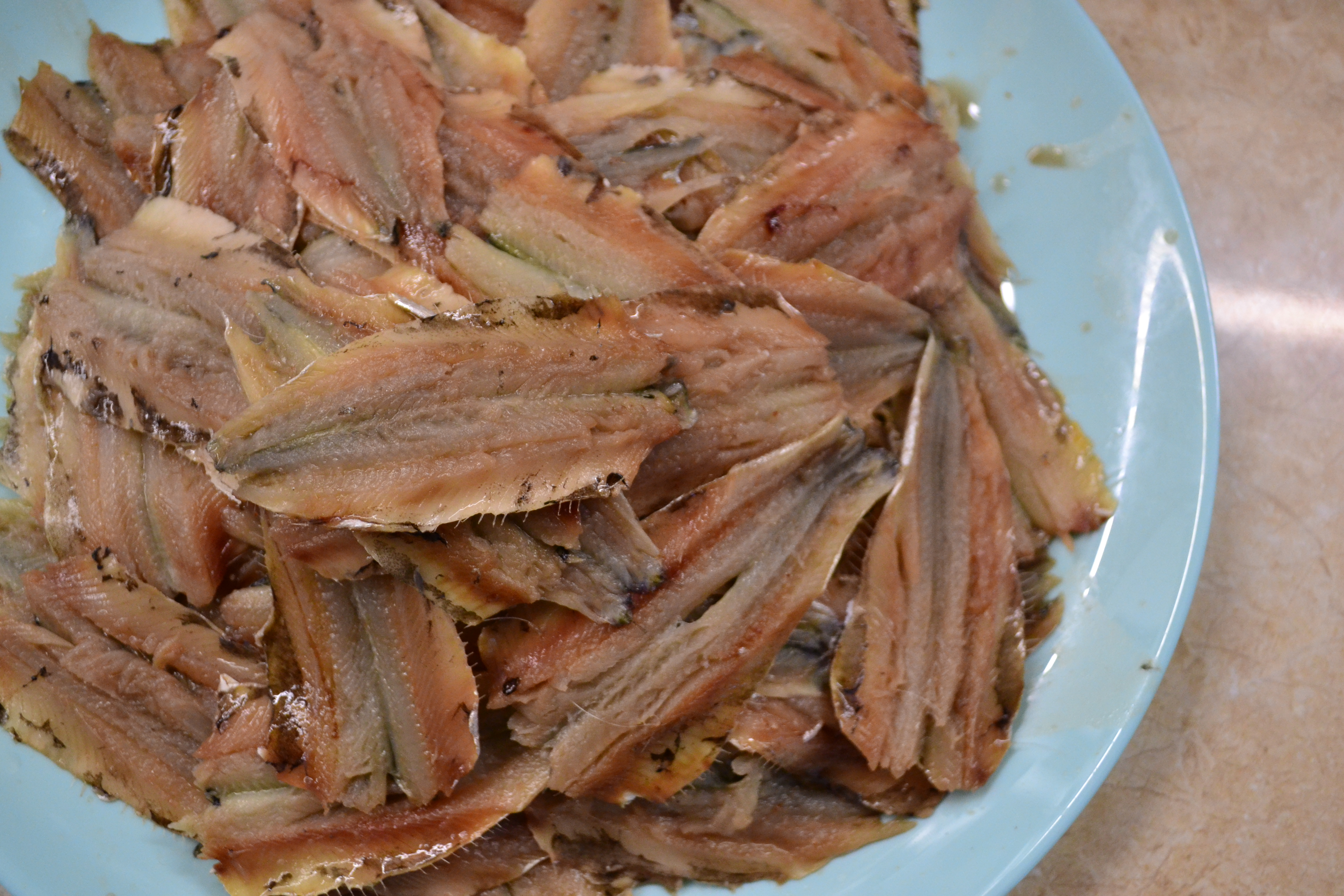

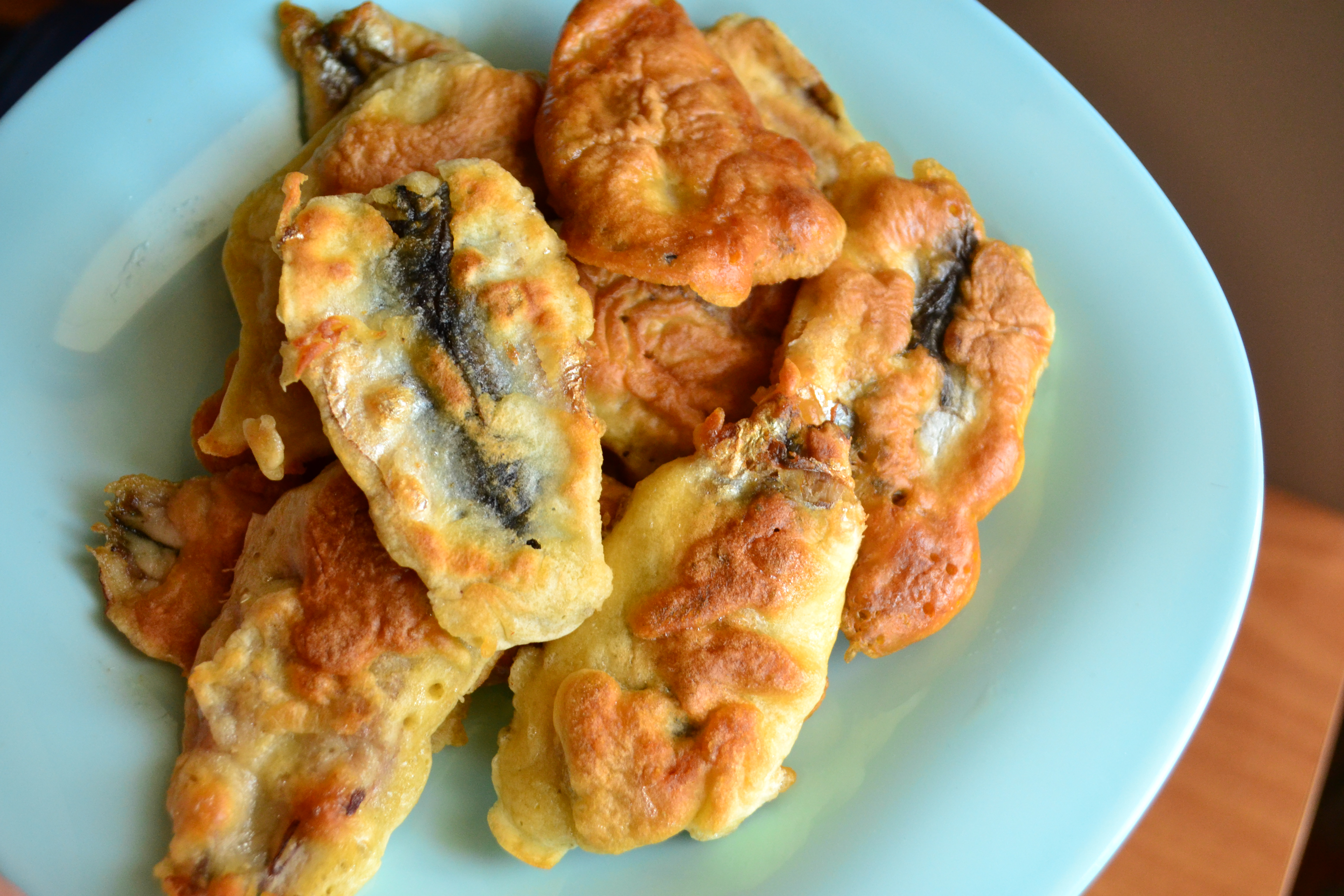

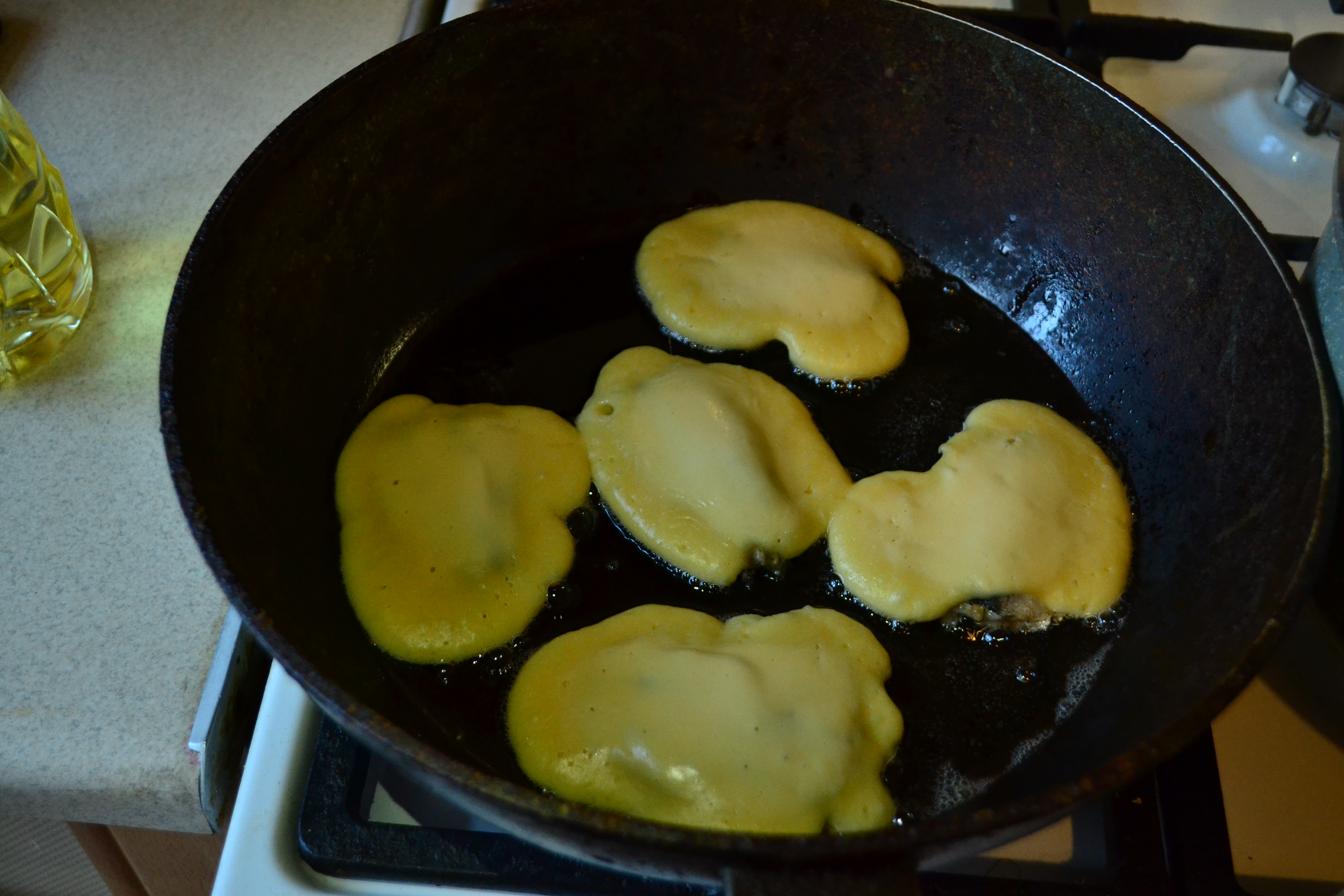

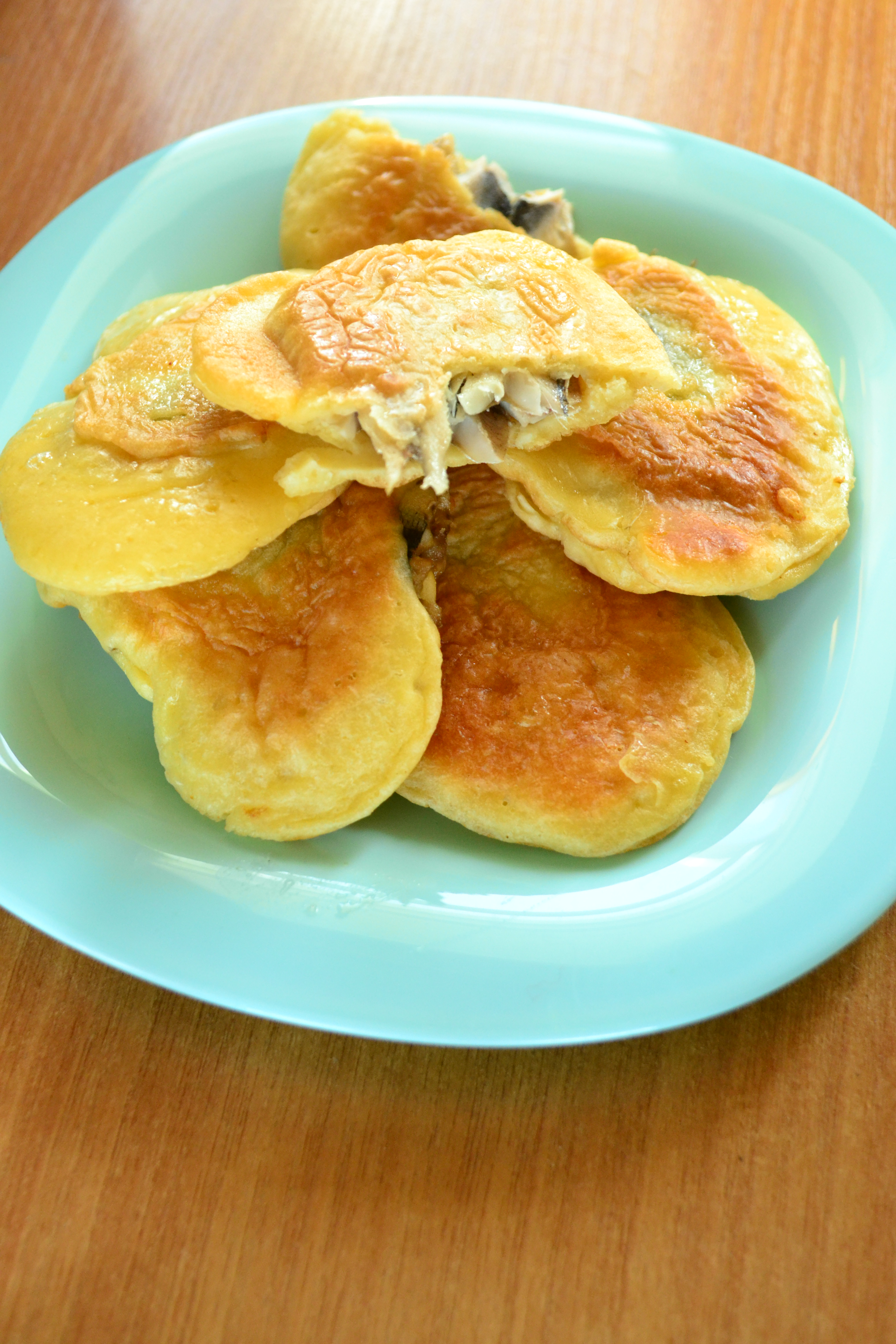

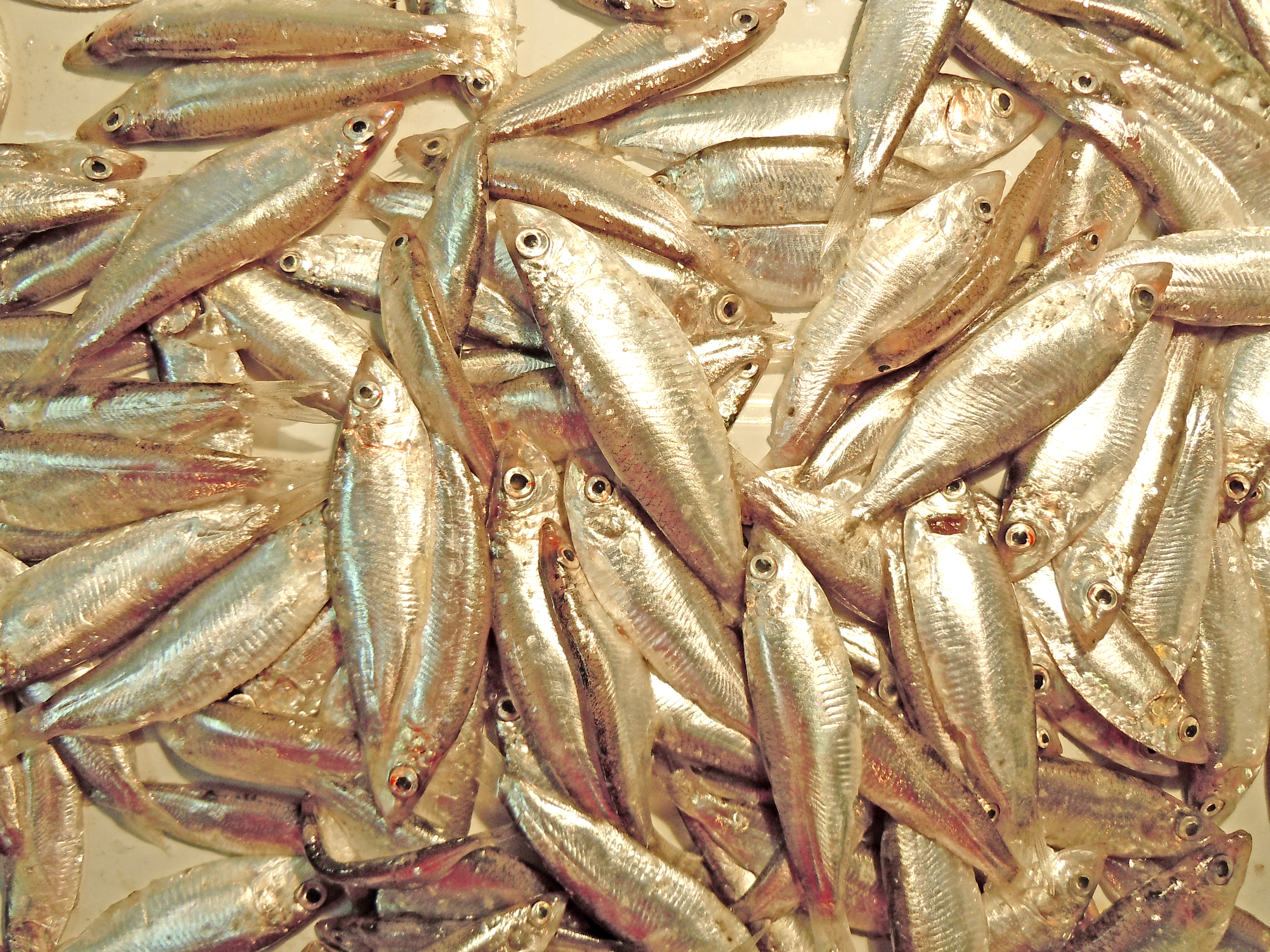

== See also ==
- List of fish in Ukraine
