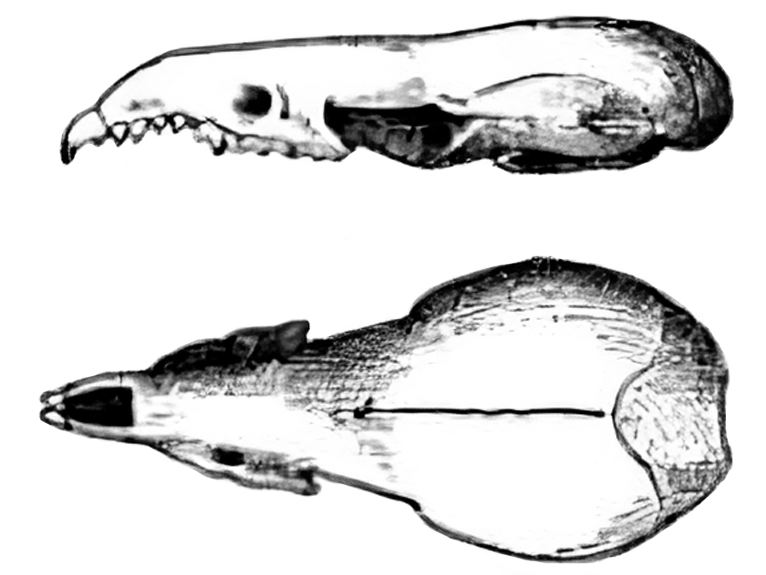
- Illustration of the skull

Conservation status
- Least Concern (IUCN 3.1)]

Scientific classification
- Kingdom: Animalia
- Phylum: Chordata
- Class: Mammalia
- Order: Eulipotyphla
- Family: Soricidae
- Genus: Sorex
- Species: S. tenellus

Binomial name
- Sorex tenellus Merriam, 1895
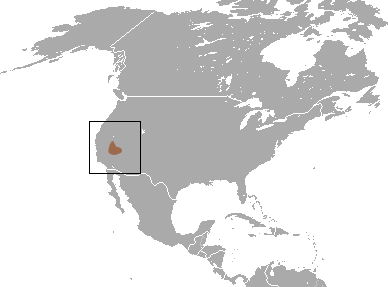
- Inyo shrew range

Synonyms
- Sorex myops HHT Jackson, 1928

= Inyo shrew =

Species of shrew

The Inyo shrew (Sorex tenellus) is a species of shrew found in the western United States. It is light gray and white in color, with a narrow skull and small body size, very similar in appearance to the related dwarf shrew (Sorex nanus), but paler and not as large. It can be found in many different habitats, from rocky, mountainous regions to wetlands and riparian areas. Not much is known about its behavioral and reproductive habits. While barely studied, their population is believed to be stable and not under any threat.

== Taxonomy ==
Sorex tenellus was first described by Clinton Hart Merriam in 1895. The type locality, Lone Pine Creek, is located in Inyo County, California. He identified two subspecies: Sorex tenellus tenellus (the nominate subspecies) and Sorex tenellus nanus (which has since been elevated to species status as Sorex nanus). In 1902, Merriam identified two new subspecies — Sorex tenellus lyelli and Sorex tenellus myops — from specimens collected the previous summer. Sorex tenellus lyelli is now given species status as Sorex lyelli, while Sorex tenellus myops was also identified as a separate species by Hartley Harrad Thompson Jackson in 1928. However, in 1941, S. myops was reclassified as a synonym of S. tenellus.

The Inyo shrew is sometimes referred to as the Great Basin dwarf shrew to distinguish it from Sorex nanus, which is known as the dwarf shrew or Rocky Mountain dwarf shrew. Due to its intermediate size and body mass between the larger dwarf shrew and the smaller ornate shrew, as well as the potential that their ranges overlap (although this has not been observed so far), it is possible that the three form a single species. Genetic studies of the genus Sorex from 2003 and 2010 have respectively identified S. tenellus as belonging to the subgenus Otisorex (along with S. hoyi, S. monticolus, S. palustris, and S. vagrans) or outside of it, in a weakly supported clade with S. fumeus, S. oreopolus, and S. ventralis.

== Description ==
The Inyo shrew is small and pale in color. Its upperparts are a light ash gray, while its lowerparts and feet are white. The tail is bicolored, with the top darker than the white underside. Its skull is small, narrow, and extremely flat. The braincase is depressed to the rostrum and the palate is slender. There is no major sexual dimorphism. In size, it ranges from 85 to 103 millimetres (3.3 to 4.1 in) long, with a tail length of 36 to 48 millimetres (1.4 to 1.9 in) and a weight of 3.4 to 4.1 grams (0.12 to 0.14 oz). Compared to the dwarf shrew (Sorex nanus), with which it was once considered conspecific, S. tenellus is slightly bigger, with a longer tail. It is also paler and grayer. Like other small shrews, it molts biannually — to its summer coat in mid-to-late July and its winter coat most likely in October.

== Distribution and habitat ==
The Inyo shrew lives exclusively in the United States. According to 2016 data by the International Union for the Conservation of Nature (IUCN), they are found only in the states California and Nevada. However, a specimen was recorded in 2014 in Deep Creek Range, Utah, the easternmost discovery of an Inyo shrew at that time, as well as the first in Utah.

It dwells in a variety of habitats, including riparian zones, canyon bottoms, rocky and mountainous areas, and communities of red firs. They may have a relatively high tolerance for drier environments. They are usually found at altitudes above 2,300 metres (1.4 mi). While a more marginal habitat, they can also inhabit wetlands. The species has been found living in sympatry with Preble's shrew (Sorex preblei) at California's Lassen Volcanic National Park.

== Behavior and ecology ==
Essentially nothing is known about the Inyo shrew's ecology, behavior, or reproduction, due to how little study it has received. It mainly consumes insects (possibly wind-borne insect bodies left at high altitudes), as well as other small invertebrates (such as worms, mollusks, and centipedes). It remains active the entire year. In 1987, the Inyo shrew was identified as the host of a newly described species of single-celled parasite recovered from its feces, Eimeria inyoni. The parasite, of the subclass Coccidia, was noted for its thin, smooth cell wall.

== Conservation ==
The IUCN classifies the Inyo shrew as being of least concern due to its stable population, its presence in multiple protected areas, and a lack of major threats to the species. The population is estimated to number well over 10,000 adults and is stable.
