= Preble's shrew =

Conservation status
- Least Concern (IUCN 3.1)

Scientific classification
- Kingdom: Animalia
- Phylum: Chordata
- Class: Mammalia
- Order: Eulipotyphla
- Family: Soricidae
- Genus: Sorex
- Species: S. preblei

Binomial name
- Sorex preblei Jackson, 1922
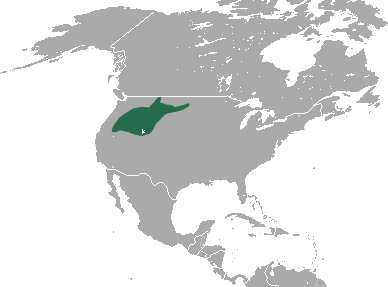
- Preble's shrew range

Species of mammal

Preble's shrew (Sorex preblei) is a small shrew distributed across the Great Basin of the United States and southern British Columbia in Canada.

== Description ==
The Preble's shrew has gray pelage on its dorsal side and silvery pelage on the ventral side. Like many other shrews, the Preble's shrew has a long snout, conspicuous ears, small eyes and plantigrade feet. The Preble's shrew is the smallest member of its genus in North America.

Preble's shrew ranges from 77 to 95 mm (3.0 to 3.7 in) in total length, with a tail length of 28–38 mm (1.1–1.5 in), hind feet of 7–11 mm (0.28–0.43 in) and an ear length of 8–11 mm (0.31–0.43 in). Besides the relatively small body length, the Preble's Shrew has several distinctive cranial characteristics. The length of its teeth are typically less than 6.5 millimeters, and the length of mandibular tooth row (C1-M3) are usually found to be less than 4.1 millimeters. The height of the coronoid process has been found to be less than 3.3 millimeters.

== Distribution and habitat ==
The Preble's shrew is known to live in Western North America, from the Columbia Plateau to the northern Great Plains. Specimens have been found in northeastern California, northern Nevada, central and eastern Oregon, southeast Washington, western Idaho, all of Montana, western Wyoming, central Colorado and north of the south shores of the Great Salt Lake in Utah. Shrew fossils have even been found as far south as New Mexico. In Canada, the shrew can only be found in south-central British Columbia. The Preble's shrew typically ranges in elevation from 1280m-2550m.

Most Preble's shrews live in arid or semiarid shrub-grasses that are associated with coniferous forest dominated by sagebrush. However, these shrews are not restricted to this habitat. They have been found In Oregon living on the big transition zone meadows. In another part of Oregon, these shrews have been found in marsh habitats. A majority of Preble's shrews have been captured in arid habitats, frequently in the immediate or nearby presence of sagebrush. This is likely for protection. Specimens captured in southwestern Wyoming were found in sagebrush-steppe areas: In southern British Columbia, Preble's shrews were captured in lightly grazed grasslands surrounded by scattered stands of Douglas-fir (Pseudotsuga menziesii) or ponderosa pine (Pinus ponderosa).

== Lifestyle and reproduction ==
Little is known about the lifestyle of this shrew, but it probably has a similar lifestyle as other shrews in its ecosystem. These other shrews are often active during both the day and night. It is probable that the Preble's shrew is active all year. Shrews have been captured in the spring and late summer in southwestern Wyoming and during the summer, fall and spring in British Columbia. In Nevada, these shrews have been collected in the summer and fall. Preble's shrews have even been collected in mid-winter in Utah. Collection records from Montana range from mid-February to early November.

The reproductive biology of Preble's shrews has not been well studied, and is largely unknown. One study focused on 26 female specimens captured in southeastern Oregon from June and July 1999. Five adult females contained developing embryos: two with 3 embryos, two with 5, and one with 6; mean = 4.4 embryos; All 13 specimens had elongated nipples and extensive mammary tissue, which suggested that each individual had previously produced at least one litter prior to their capture. Four juvenile females exhibited no evidence of reproductive activity. For 16 males, testis size in 15 of the 16 individuals was either less than 2.0 cubic millimeters, signifying that these males were non-reproductive, presumably captured in the year of birth or more than 16.0 cubic millimeters suggesting that they were older and reproductive.; one male with intermediate testis size had little wear on I1, indicating it may have just reached sexual maturity. The data collected in this study suggest that at least two litters were produced prior to the June and July pregnancies.

== Ecology ==
Other shrews that live in the same ecosystem as the Preble's shrew include Sorex cinereus, S. haydeni, S. merriami, S. monticolus, S. nanus, and S. vagrans. Preble's shrews have been collected in Montana in close association with Sorex cinereus and S. monticolus.

Measurements of population trends, vital statistics and estimates of population density have not been thoroughly studied. At nearly all of the locations where several species of shrews have been captured in association with Preble's shrew, it is always one of the less abundant species, suggesting competitive exclusion. Predators of Preble's shrew have not been reported or well documented.

The Preble's shrew has been an Animal Candidate Reviewed for Listing as Endangered or Threatened Species twice in recent history but is currently not listed as an endangered or threatened species. No conservation efforts are currently being undertaken.

== Diet ==
The diet of Preble's shrew has not been well described, but it likely resembles the diets of other cinereus-group shrews, which feed on small insects and other small invertebrates (worms, molluscs, centipedes, etc.). It has a relatively low bite force, which suggests that it feeds on soft-bodied prey.
