= Marsh shrew =

Conservation status
- Least Concern (IUCN 3.1)

Scientific classification
- Kingdom: Animalia
- Phylum: Chordata
- Class: Mammalia
- Order: Eulipotyphla
- Family: Soricidae
- Genus: Sorex
- Species: S. bendirii

Binomial name
- Sorex bendirii Merriam, 1884

Subspecies
- S. b. albiventer (Merriam, 1895); S. b. bendirii (Merriam, 1884); S. b. palmeri (Merriam, 1895)
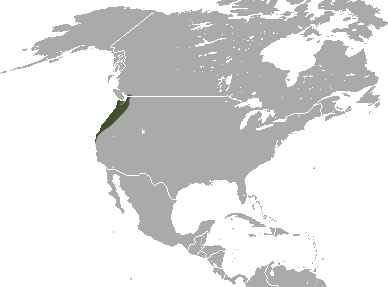
- Marsh shrew range

Synonyms
- List: Atophyrax bendirii Merriam, 1884; Sorex bendirii Dobson, 1890; Sorex (Atophyrax) bendirii palmeri Merriam, 1895

Species of shrew

The marsh shrew (Sorex bendirii), also known as the Pacific water shrew, Bendire's water shrew, Bendire's shrew and Jesus shrew, is the largest North American member of the genus Sorex (long-tailed shrews). Primarily covered in dark-brown fur, it is found near aquatic habitats along the Pacific coast from southern British Columbia to northern California. With air trapped in its fur for buoyancy, marsh shrews can run for three to five seconds on top of the water. It measures about 16 cm (6.3 in) in length, including a 7-centimetre (2.8 in)-long tail, and weighs an average of 14.5–16 g (0.51–0.56 oz). The marsh shrew's diet consists mainly of invertebrates, which it hunts on land and in the water. They are rare; their populations are thought to be in decline, and they are considered endangered in parts of their range.

== Description ==
Marsh shrew skull (side view)

Skull top and bottom views

The marsh shrew is the largest member of the genus Sorex in North America, and mammalogist David Nagorsen described it as "an attractive mammal". Its fur is primarily dark brown, and it has a long tail. Although the marsh shrew's fur is usually uniformly dark on its back and abdomen, the abdominal fur of populations (S. b. albiventer) on the Olympic Peninsula may be white. The marsh shrew is about 16 cm (6.3 in) in length, including a 7-centimetre (2.8 in)-long tail, and weighs about 14.5–16 g (0.51–0.56 oz). Its hind feet, slightly fringed with coarse hairs on the toes, measure about 19.2 mm (0.76 in).

Although in some areas the marsh shrew is sympatric with other members of the genus Sorex, no other large, velvety, gray-black shrew shares this geographic range. Its size distinguishes it from all but the American water shrew (Sorex palustris). Although the marsh shrew and the American water shrew (the two largest shrews in North America) share some features, the American water shrew has more dark-grey-to-black fur on its back, a silver-grey belly and a bi-colored tail and the marsh shrew's fringed hairs are more distinct. The American water shrew has a smaller skull, without the marsh shrew's characteristic curvature, and its upper incisors have less-distinct medial tines. The marsh shrew typically has a longer snout than that of the American water shrew, which is more streamlined when viewed from the side.

The marsh shrew's skull is relatively large, and its condylobasal skull length is usually greater than 19.3 mm (0.76 in). There is a distinctive, downward-sloping curve along the snout (rostrum). Its dental formula is incisors: 1/1; unicuspids: 5/1; premolars: 1/1; molars: 3/3. Of the five upper unicuspids the third is distinctly smaller than the fourth, and they have a pigmented ridge extending to the cingulum. There is a large medial tine on the large upper incisor, in the anterior pigmented region. The reddish pigmentation of the enamel, the result of iron deposits, is thought to be an adaptation strengthening the enamel.

There are no known fossil remains. The marsh shrew's karyotype somatic number is 2n = 54, and its fundamental number = 70.

== Taxonomy and naming ==
It was first described in the scientific literature in 1884 by Clinton Hart Merriam with its original name, Atophyrax bendirii (a monotypic taxon at the time). The first specimen was obtained 18 mi (29 km) southeast of Fort Klamath in Klamath County, Oregon, at a location 1 mi (1.6 km) from the Williamson River. Merriam obtained the specimen from Charles Bendire, an ornithologist and army captain stationed at Fort Klamath. The shrew was caught in late July or early August by one of the dogs in the camp, and a soldier gave it to Bendire. Merriam named it Bendire's shrew (Atophyrax bendirii) in appreciation of Bendire's contribution. Merriam reported that the animal represented a new genus, Atophyrax, deriving from the Greek and meaning "anomalous sorex". The marsh shrew was later reclassified in the genus Sorex.

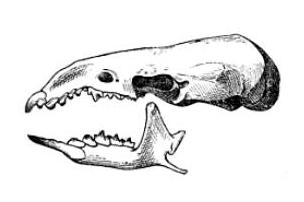
Palmer marsh shrew (S. b. palmeri); type specimen skull depiction from Merriam, 1895

The marsh shrew and the American water shrew (Sorex palustris) share many physical characteristics. The former is found in a narrower area from the northwest coast to the lower slopes of the inland mountains. The American water shrew is more widely distributed across the western mountains and through the subarctic regions of Canada and the eastern U.S. The species' ranges are primarily allopatric; although they may overlap (sympatry) in coastal regions of the Pacific Northwest, differences in elevation tend to separate them. Early taxonomists placed these mammals into separate subgenera; Merriam assigned the marsh shrew to Atophyrax, and Jackson (1928) assigned the Pacific water shrew to Neosorex. A closer, dentition-based relationship was assigned by Findley (1955), with both species assigned to the subgenus Otisorex. Findley hypothesized that in the early Pleistocene, the ancestors of masked and vagrant shrews (Sorex cinereus and Sorex vagrans, respectively) diverged; during the Yarmouth interglacial, the American water shrew and marsh shrew diverged from their vagrant-shrew ancestors. Three other Sorex species evolved during the Sangamonian Stage: the dwarf shrew (S. nanus), the southeastern shrew (Sorex longirostris) and the ornate shrew (Sorex ornatus). Findley's assignment of the marsh shrew and the American water shrew to Otisorex was later reinforced by biochemical and genetic studies. In 2005, findings were published (based on mitochondrial DNA analysis) which better defined the nature of the relationships between marsh shrews, Pacific water shrews and their respective subspecies. Variations in the sequencing of cytochrome b mitochondrial DNA were assessed, and the results of the 2005 phylogeny for the marsh shrew are shown below in detail.

- Sorex
  - Sorex ornatus
  - Sorex vagrans
  - - S. palustris palustris
    - - Sorex bendirii
        - S. b. bendirii
          - TK75014
          - TK75011
        - - S. b. palmeri
            - AF238031
            - AF238032
          - S. b. bendirii
            - TK55976
            - TK55975
      - Sorex palustris
        - S. p. navigator
        - - S. p. navigator
          - S. p. brooksi
          - S. p. navigator

=== Subspecies ===
The marsh shrew has three subspecies:

- S. bendirii albiventer (Merriam, 1895)
- S. bendirii bendirii (Merriam, 1884)
- S. bendirii palmeri (Merriam, 1895)

S. b. albiventer is found on the Olympic Peninsula of Washington, S . b . bendirii in the Cascades and southwestern British Columbia and S. b. palmeri in coastal Oregon. These specifications have historically been based on fur markings, skull shape and dental details of unclear significance, and their validity is uncertain.

== Distribution and habitat ==
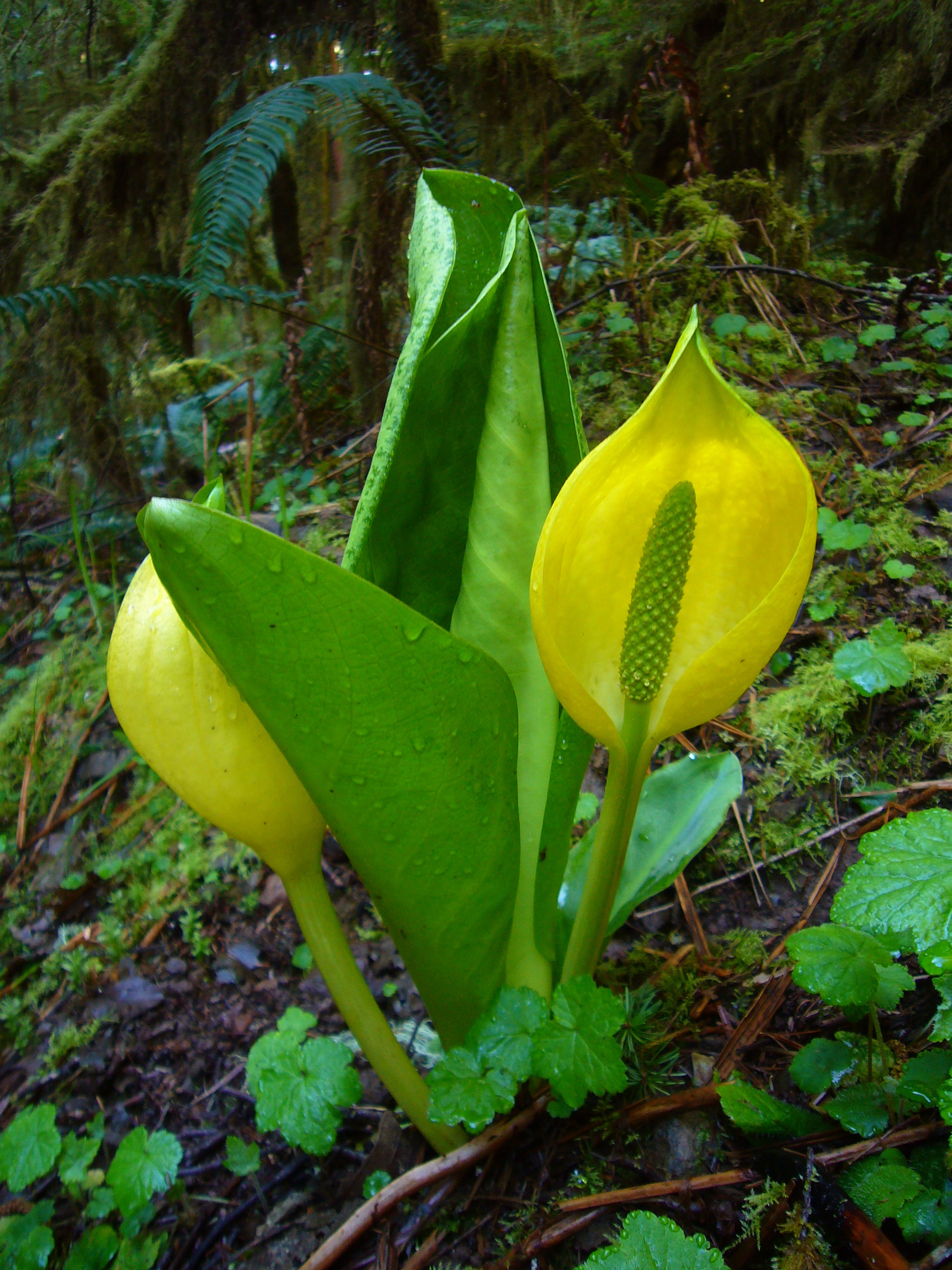
Marsh shrews often live near marshes with western skunk cabbage.

The geographic range of the marsh shrew extends from southwest British Columbia, along the western regions of the U.S. states of Washington and Oregon and through northwestern California to the area north of San Francisco. The subspecies S. b. albiventer is found on the Olympic Peninsula. S. b. palmeri is found from western Oregon (south of the Columbia River) to extrema northwestern California. S. b. bendirii is found from the northern parts of the range (except for the Olympic Peninsula) south along the eastern range to the remaining range in California. In British Columbia the eastern limits are the Chilliwack River and Agassiz, and the northern limits are the low elevations on the north shore of Burrard Inlet.

Marsh shrews typically live in wetlands (such as marshes), and their habitat includes extensive forest canopy and ground cover from shrubs, logs, and debris; they may also be found in riparian environments. During cold, rainy seasons, they may travel as much as a kilometer from wet areas to more sheltered habitats; these generally include mixed deciduous or coniferous forest with downed logs and surface cover. Marsh shrews have been collected from near sea level to as high as 4,356 ft (1,328 m) in the Cascades. They may inhabit forests of red alder, bigleaf maple, western hemlock or redcedar, often near marshes with western skunk cabbage. In British Columbia the marsh shrew is generally found below 600 metres (2,000 ft), but it has been collected at 850 metres (2,790 ft) in Mount Seymour Provincial Park. Environmental officials in British Columbia believe that marsh shrews are one of the rarest small mammals in the province. In 1992, Carlos Galindo-Leal and Gustavo Zuleta trapped 1,000 small mammals at 55 locations in a large area of southwestern British Columbia; only three were Pacific water shrews.

During spring and summer 1983, biologists in western Oregon studied small-mammal distribution (including marsh shrews) near streams and along the riparian fringes of coniferous forests. "Riparian fringe" was defined as at least 15–20 m from a stream. The North American deermouse was caught in greater numbers than any other mammal, representing around 80% of all captures. Sixteen species were trapped, with the marsh shrew representing less than two percent of mammals captured in this study. All the marsh shrews were trapped at streamside, and were found in all three ages of coniferous forests: old-growth, mature and young growth.

== Behavior and ecology ==
The marsh shrew eats invertebrates, including spiders, earthworms, sowbugs, centipedes, termites and other terrestrial and aquatic arthropods. It was observed in captivity pursuing and killing a goldfish, but not eating it. In contrast, the American water shrew has been observed killing and eating fish. A study of the gastric contents of marsh shrews in Oregon indicated that at least 25% of their diet is aquatic, including insect larvae, slugs and snails, mayfly naiads and other, unidentified invertebrates. Other researchers have reported that their diet may also include aquatic insects (water beetles and stonefly nymphs), craneflies, ground beetles, spiders, harvestmen, centipedes, earthworms, slugs and small terrestrial snails. The marsh shrew swims, making short dives in search of food; its mobile snout, whiskers and lips are used to find and capture underwater prey. Before eating, it returns to land. Air trapped in its fur provides buoyancy, and marsh shrews can run for as long as 3 to 5 seconds along the top of the water. According to mammalogist Donald Pattie, they can "scull on the surface like whirligig beetles". The air trapped in its fur gives it a silvery sheen. On land, its foreleg and opposite hind leg move at the same time.

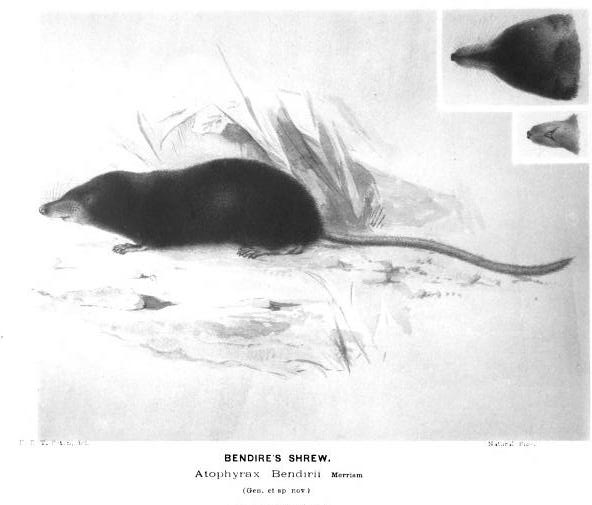
Marsh shrew from C. Hart Merriam's original 1884 description

It is active throughout the year, primarily at night. Gestation is about three weeks, and the female has a litter of three or four young. Nests in the wild, built from shredded bark, are in a tunnel or under a log. Marsh shrews typically live about 18 months, and males are not thought to reach sexual maturity during their first summer. Since their lifespan is short, they apparently breed for only one season. Although no breeding data exist for British Columbia, the breeding season elsewhere is from late January to late August; most young are born in March. The number of litters a female rears is unknown.

The strong odor associated with marsh shrews (in common with other long-tailed shrews) may be a means of communication. Similar to other shrews, they have poor eyesight. If a marsh shrew is placed in a foreign environment (such as along an edge of a raised surface), it will run off the edge and continue to run after landing on the surface below. Landing in water, it dives beneath the surface. Marsh shrews are easily trapped in sunken cans, possibly due to their inability to see where the edges of surfaces drop. In captivity they vocalize when they are displaced or scuffle with other animals in their cage, twittering shrilly if disturbed while eating or in a confrontation over food (such as a worm). Although it is uncertain whether marsh shrews cache (or hoard) food in the wild, in captivity they set aside nightcrawlers in a corner of the cage for later consumption; no other food items were set aside in this fashion.

Acarine parasites include the Glycyphagidae (Glycyphagus hypudaei and Orycteroxenus soricis); the Laelapidae (Androlaelaps fahrenholzi, Echinonyssus obsoletus, Haemogamasus occidentalis and Haemogamasus reidi); the Listrophoridae (Listrophorus mexicanus); the Myobiidae (Amorphacarus hengererorum, Amorphacarus soricis, Protomyobia atophyracis and Protomyobia brevisetosa), and the Pygmephoridae (Pygmephorus horridus and Pygmephorus whitakeri). Probable predators include owls, fish and the Pacific giant salamander.

== Human interaction ==
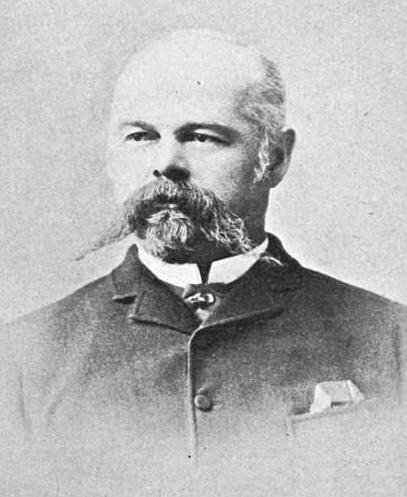
Charles Bendire, after whom the marsh shrew was named

Before Donald Pattie's research during the late 1960s, when his team studied marsh shrews in captivity, little was known about their behavior. Before then, most information about the marsh shrew was from notes about the mammal's habitat and information about trapping it. Its descriptions in the literature were largely derived from the examination of museum specimens.

=== Conservation status ===
Marsh shrews are listed as "Endangered" by the Committee on the Status of Endangered Wildlife in Canada (COSEWIC), their habitat in British Columbia limited to the lower Fraser Valley. Their available habitat continues to degrade as a result of economic activity in the area; with little chance of the trend reversing, they are rare in that part of Canada. COSEWIC designated the marsh shrew as "Threatened" from April 1994 until May 2000, updating its status in April 2006 to "Endangered." According to the IUCN, marsh shrews are of "Least Concern" in terms of conservation. Although the shrew is considered a rare mammal and its numbers are thought to be in decline, no population estimates are currently provided and its rate of decline is not considered fast enough to warrant placing it in a more-threatened category. Suitable wetland habitat is declining, due primarily to urbanization and the conversion of habitat to agriculture, and areas of protected habitat are expected to be provided in the shrew's broad geographic range.
