= Arizona shrew =

Conservation status
- Least Concern (IUCN 3.1)

- Vulnerable (NatureServe)

Scientific classification
- Kingdom: Animalia
- Phylum: Chordata
- Class: Mammalia
- Infraclass: Placentalia
- Order: Eulipotyphla
- Family: Soricidae
- Genus: Sorex
- Species: S. arizonae

Binomial name
- Sorex arizonae Diersing & Hoffmeister, 1977
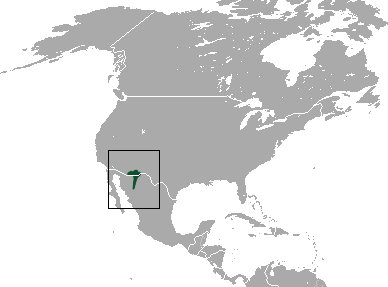
- Arizona shrew range

Species of mammal

The Arizona shrew (Sorex arizonae) is a species of shrew native to North America.

== Description ==
The Arizona shrew is one of the smaller species of shrew, with a head and body 5 to 7 cm (2.0 to 2.8 in) in length, and a tail about 4 cm (1.6 in) long. When fully grown, they weigh an average of only 3.5 g (0.12 oz). Their fur ranges from grey to brown, and is paler on the underparts of the animal. Long thought to be the same as Merriam's shrew, it was identified as a separate species in 1977, and can be physically distinguished only by fine details of the skull and teeth.

== Distribution and habitat ==
The Arizona shrew is found in Chihuahua in Mexico, and in southern Arizona and New Mexico in the United States. It inhabits forested mountainous terrain between 1,575 and 2,590 m (5,167 and 8,497 ft) dominated by coniferous trees or by mixed pine and oak. There are no known subspecies.

== Biology ==
Arizona shrews inhabit primary forest with heavy undergrowth, and are particularly common in mesic riverine canyons. Despite their preference for such canyons, they are not necessarily found close to open water. They apparently breed between late July and October. They are believed to have diverged from the closely related Merriam's shrew relatively recently, during the late Pleistocene or early Holocene.
