= Azumi shrew =

Conservation status
- Least Concern (IUCN 3.1)

Scientific classification
- Kingdom: Animalia
- Phylum: Chordata
- Class: Mammalia
- Order: Eulipotyphla
- Family: Soricidae
- Genus: Sorex
- Species: S. hosonoi

Binomial name
- Sorex hosonoi Imaizumi, 1954
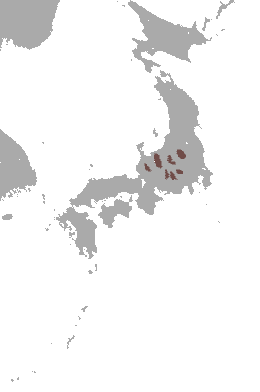
- Azumi shrew range

Species of mammal

The Azumi shrew (Sorex hosonoi) is a species of mammal in the family Soricidae. It is endemic to Japan, where it is found in the mountainous regions of central Honshu Island. It is a close relative of the Eurasian least shrew (Sorex minutissimus). It is threatened by habitat loss.
