= New Mexico shrew =

Conservation status
- Data Deficient (IUCN 3.1)

Scientific classification
- Kingdom: Animalia
- Phylum: Chordata
- Class: Mammalia
- Order: Eulipotyphla
- Family: Soricidae
- Genus: Sorex
- Species: S. neomexicanus

Binomial name
- Sorex neomexicanus Bailey, 1913
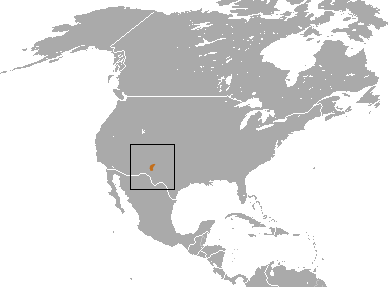
- New Mexico shrew range

Species of mammal

The New Mexico shrew (Sorex neomexicanus) is a species of mammal in the family Soricidae. It is found only in New Mexico in the Capitan and Sandia-Manzano Mountains.

Its total length is 103 to 121 mm (4.1 to 4.8 in). Its tail length is 39 to 54 mm (1.5 to 2.1 in). It weighs 6 to 8 g (0.21 to 0.28 oz). It was included in Sorex monticolus until 1996. It is distinguished from Sorex monticolus by its teeth. The row of unicuspid teeth is longer in Sorex neomexicanus than in Sorex monticolus, and Sorex neomexicanus has a wider space between its first upper unicuspid and second upper unicuspid (going from front to back) than Sorex monticolus does.
