= Apennine =

Apennine may refer to:

- The Apennine Mountains

== Other places on Earth ==
- The Apennine or Italian Peninsula
- Apennins, a department of the First French Empire

== Astronomical names ==
- The lunar Montes Apenninus
- 10959 Appennino, an asteroid

== Plants and animals ==
- Appenninica, or Apennine, a modern breed of domestic sheep
- Apennine shrew, an insectivore endemic to Italy
- Apennine yellow-bellied toad, an amphibian endemic to Italy
- Apennine deciduous montane forests, an ecoregion of Italy
- Apennine brown bear, another name for the Marsican brown bear
- Apennine wolf, a subspecies of the gray wolf
- Apennine hare, another name for the Corsican hare
- South Apennine mixed montane forests, an ecoregion

== Cultural objects ==
- Apennine Base Tunnel, a railway tunnel of Italy
- The archaeological Apennine culture
- Giro dell'Appennino, a bicycle tour
