= American pygmy shrew =

Conservation status
- Least Concern (IUCN 3.1)

Scientific classification
- Kingdom: Animalia
- Phylum: Chordata
- Class: Mammalia
- Order: Eulipotyphla
- Family: Soricidae
- Genus: Sorex
- Species: S. hoyi

Binomial name
- Sorex hoyi Baird, 1857
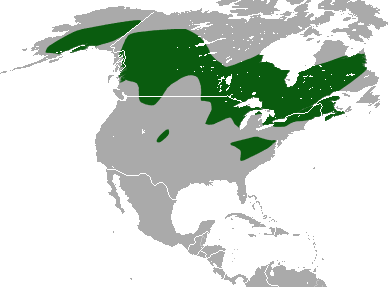
- American pygmy shrew range

Species of mammal

The American pygmy shrew (Sorex hoyi), also called the eastern pygmy shrew, is a small shrew found throughout much of Alaska, Canada, and the northern contiguous United States, as well as south along the Appalachian Mountains and in a small region in the Colorado and Wyoming Rockies. The species was first discovered in 1831 by naturalist William Cane in Georgian Bay, Parry Sound.

This animal is found in northern coniferous and deciduous forests of North America. It is believed to be the second-smallest mammal in the world, but has an extremely large appetite for its size. Due to its fast metabolism, it needs to eat constantly. It digs through moist soils and decaying leaf litter for food.

== Description ==
The American pygmy shrew is the smallest mammal native to North America and is one of the smallest mammals in the world, just slightly larger than the Etruscan shrew of Eurasia. Its body is about 5 cm (2 in) long including a 2-cm-long tail, and it weighs about 2.0 to 4.5 g (0.07 to 0.16 oz). Its pelage is generally a reddish or grayish brown during the summer, and a white-gray color during the winter. The underside is generally a lighter gray. This animal molts about twice a year, once during late summer, and again during the spring. It has a narrow head with a pointed nose, and whiskers. The eyes are small and well hidden. The primary senses used for hunting are hearing and smell.

== Phylogeny ==
Sorex hoyi was originally placed in the genus Microsorex, which was a subgenus under Sorex until more research had been done. The American pygmy shrew is in the order Soricomorpha and the family Soricidae. Its two closest relatives are the smokey shrew (S. fumeus) and the large-toothed shrew (S. macrodon). This genus is believed to have appeared in the late Miocene.

== Distribution and habitat ==
Pygmy shrews are distributed throughout the subalpine and boreal areas of North America, ranging from Canada and Alaska to the Great Lakes and south along the Appalachians. There is also an isolated population in the Colorado and Wyoming Rockies. The species is commonly found in Virginia, Kentucky, North Carolina, South Carolina, Georgia, Tennessee, and Alabama and is the second-most widespread of the long-tailed soricids in the southeast, after the southeastern shrew.

Some pygmy shrew populations comprise their own subspecies. Notably, the geographically isolated pygmy shrews found in the mountain forests of northern Colorado and south-central Wyoming are a unique relictual group from the Pleistocene/Holocene transition, classified as the subspecies S. hoyi montanus. Another subspecies of pygmy shrews is S. hoyi hoyi, which resides in the prairies of eastern South Dakota.

Although S. hoyi prefers moist habitats, it has been recorded to live in areas with both wet and dry soil. However, if it is living in a more arid environment, it needs to have a source of water nearby. Subspecies S. h. montanus occurs in moist coniferous forest, "possibly preferring late-seral stands and the edges between wet and dry forest types." S. h. hoyi has a broader range of habitat but is still mostly found in wet prairies and wetland margins.

== Diet ==
Primarily insectivorous, this animal forages in moist soil and dead leaves to find its prey. Because of the pygmy shrew's small size, its diet primarily consists of insects and insect larvae, while the larger shrews eat insects and worms. Its diet is almost exclusively protein-based. To stay alive, the pygmy shrew has to eat three times its body weight daily, which means capturing prey every 15 to 30 minutes, day and night; a full hour without food means certain death. Because of this high metabolism, the pygmy shrew never sleeps more than a few minutes at a time, as it is in a constant search for food. Although due to its small body size it is always losing body heat, being small has its advantages during the winter when food is scarce. Predators of the American pygmy shrew include hawks, brook trout, owls, snakes, and domestic cats.

== Lifecycle and reproduction ==
Little is known about the reproductive cycle of pygmy shrews. They appear to mate year round, with a bias of births occurring from November through March. The gestation period is estimated to last about 18 days. Females produce a litter of three to eight young, and only give birth once a year. The age the young are weaned is not known with certainty, but by 18 days old, they are nearly full grown, and are usually independent by 25 days. Being mammals, the mother nourishes her young with milk. The maximum lifespan of a pygmy shrew is not known, but it is believed to be about 16–17 months.

== Behavior ==
Pygmy shrews dig through soil and leaf litter to search for food, and can use tunnel networks created by other animals to aid in that search. They do not sleep or rest for extended periods of times, but alternate between rest and activity all day and night, showing a bias towards nighttime. They have keen senses of smell and hearing to help them find prey. When feeling threatened or scared, the shrews make a sharp squeaking noise and run for cover. Shrews can also swim, which makes them prey to brook trout. Pygmy shrews are in constant motion, and captured shrews have been observed "climbing and walking upside down on the wire top of the cage."

== Physiology ==
Due to its high metabolism, the pygmy shrew is active year-round and does not engage in any form of torpor or hibernation. Shrews have been known to burrow through snow to find food, showing that winter snow does not stop them. Though pygmy shrews are constantly losing body heat due to their small size, their small size also has benefits, as they require less food to generate sufficient energy than would a larger shrew.

Although usually a positive correlation exists between latitude and shrew body size, the American pygmy shrew is an exception.
