= Alaska tiny shrew =

Conservation status
- Least Concern (IUCN 3.1)

Scientific classification
- Kingdom: Animalia
- Phylum: Chordata
- Class: Mammalia
- Order: Eulipotyphla
- Family: Soricidae
- Genus: Sorex
- Species: S. yukonicus

Binomial name
- Sorex yukonicus Dokuchaev, 1997
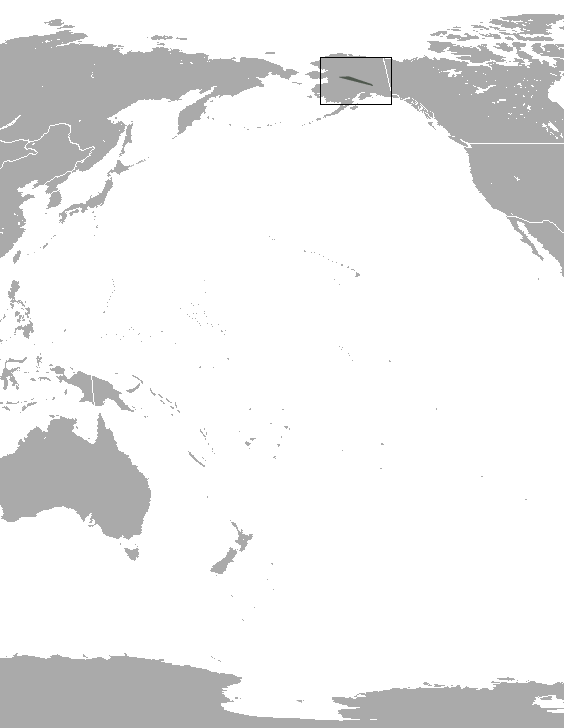
- Alaska tiny shrew range

Species of mammal

The Alaska tiny shrew (Sorex yukonicus) is a species of shrew. It is endemic to Alaska.

This species was formerly included under the description of the Eurasian least shrew (S. minutissimus). It was described as a separate species in 1997. It was named for the Yukon River.

This shrew occurs in central Alaska, and more recently it has been found in the southwestern part of the state. It always lives near rivers.

This species has tricolored fur in varying shades of gray.
