= Kamchatka shrew =

Conservation status
- Least Concern (IUCN 3.1)

Scientific classification
- Kingdom: Animalia
- Phylum: Chordata
- Class: Mammalia
- Infraclass: Placentalia
- Order: Eulipotyphla
- Family: Soricidae
- Genus: Sorex
- Species: S. camtschatica

Binomial name
- Sorex camtschatica Yudin, 1972
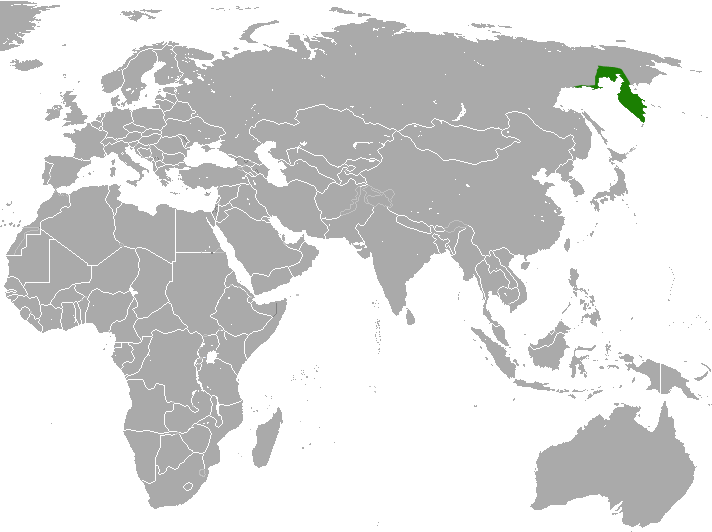
- Kamchatka Shrew range

Species of mammal

The Kamchatka shrew (Sorex camtschatica) is a species of mammal in the family Soricidae. It is endemic to Russia.

== Classification ==
The species was first described in 1972. Before that it was considered a subspecies of cinereus shrew (Sorex cinereus).

== Range ==
Kamchatka shrew inhabits riparian scrubs in North-Eastern Siberia, in the upper reaches of the river Omolon (its tributary Kegan), and in Kamchatka (Kambalny Bay, Lake Azhabachye, neighborhood of Milkovo).

== Appearance ==
The body length reaches 66 mm (2.6 in), with an average of 57 mm (2.2 in). The tail is about 79% of the body length and can be 54 mm (2.1 in) long. The average weight of an adult is 5 g (0.18 oz). The back is ashy-gray, sides are lighter, with brown tones. The belly is light gray. This species is characterized by the highly elongated rear feet with well-defined bristle brush hair.

== Life events ==
Biology of the species is poorly understood. The breeding season lasts from April to September. Females annually produce up to three litters with 5.1 cubs per liter on average.

== Bibliography ==
- Yudin, B. S. (1989). Bolshakov, V. N. (ed.). Насекомоядные млекопитающие Сибири. Novosibirsk: Nauka. ISBN 5-02-028930-2.
