= Kozlov's shrew =

Conservation status
- Data Deficient (IUCN 3.1)

Scientific classification
- Kingdom: Animalia
- Phylum: Chordata
- Class: Mammalia
- Order: Eulipotyphla
- Family: Soricidae
- Genus: Sorex
- Species: S. kozlovi

Binomial name
- Sorex kozlovi Stroganov, 1952
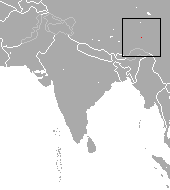
- Kozlov's shrew range

Species of mammal

Kozlov's shrew (Sorex kozlovi) is a red-toothed shrew found only at the Mekong River, Tibet, China. It is listed as a data deficient species.
