= Verapaz shrew =

Conservation status
- Least Concern (IUCN 3.1)

Scientific classification
- Kingdom: Animalia
- Phylum: Chordata
- Class: Mammalia
- Order: Eulipotyphla
- Family: Soricidae
- Genus: Sorex
- Species: S. veraepacis

Binomial name
- Sorex veraepacis Alston, 1877
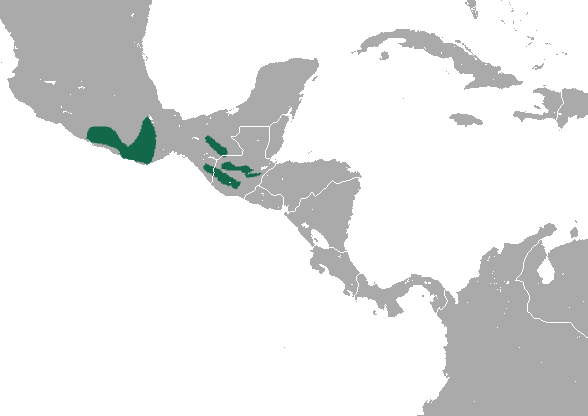
- Verapaz shrew range

Species of mammal

The Verapaz shrew (Sorex veraepacis) is a species of mammal in the family Soricidae. It is found in Guatemala and Mexico.
