= Tibetan shrew =

Conservation status
- Data Deficient (IUCN 3.1)

Scientific classification
- Kingdom: Animalia
- Phylum: Chordata
- Class: Mammalia
- Infraclass: Placentalia
- Order: Eulipotyphla
- Family: Soricidae
- Genus: Sorex
- Species: S. thibetanus

Binomial name
- Sorex thibetanus Kastschenko, 1905
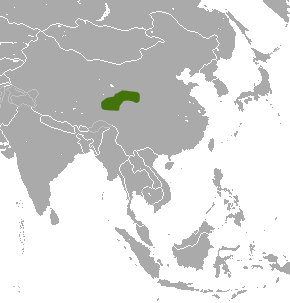
- Tibetan shrew range

Species of mammal

The Tibetan shrew (Sorex thibetanus) is a species of mammal in the family Soricidae. It is found in western China.
