= Carmen Mountain shrew =

Conservation status
- Vulnerable (IUCN 3.1)

Scientific classification
- Kingdom: Animalia
- Phylum: Chordata
- Class: Mammalia
- Order: Eulipotyphla
- Family: Soricidae
- Genus: Sorex
- Species: S. milleri

Binomial name
- Sorex milleri Jackson, 1947
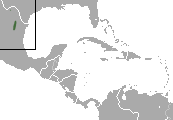
- Carmen Mountain shrew range

Species of mammal

The Carmen Mountain shrew (Sorex milleri) is a species of mammal in the family Soricidae. It is endemic to Mexico.
