= Gansu shrew =

Conservation status
- Data Deficient (IUCN 3.1)

Scientific classification
- Kingdom: Animalia
- Phylum: Chordata
- Class: Mammalia
- Order: Eulipotyphla
- Family: Soricidae
- Genus: Sorex
- Species: S. cansulus

Binomial name
- Sorex cansulus Thomas, 1912
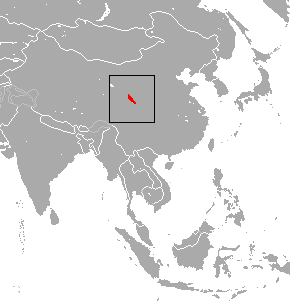
- Gansu shrew range

Species of mammal

The Gansu shrew (Sorex cansulus) is a red-toothed shrew found only in a small part of Gansu province and other adjacent areas of China. With its very limited range, it is sensitive to habitat loss and is listed as a "vulnerable species" in the Chinese Red List, while the IUCN lists it as being "data deficient"

== Taxonomy ==
The Gansu shrew was first described in 1912 by the British zoologist Oldfield Thomas, who named it Sorex cansulus. It closely resembles Laxmann's shrew (Sorex caecutiens), a common species with a wide range, and there were doubts as to the validity of the species. However, the discovery more recently of other locations where it appears to co-exist with S. caecutiens lends support to the validity of the species.

== Description ==
The Gansu shrew has a head-and-body length of 62 to 64 mm (2.4 to 2.5 in), with a tail of 38 to 43 mm (1.5 to 1.7 in). The hind foot measures 12 mm (0.5 in). The dorsal fur is greyish-brown with buff flanks and hazel-coloured underparts. Both the fore feet and the hind feet are brownish-white. The upper side of the tail is dark brown while the underside is paler.

== Distribution ==
The Gansu shrew is endemic to the province of Gansu in central China, where it is found at altitudes between about 2,600 and 3,000 m (8,500 and 9,800 ft). At one time known only from two sites in the immediate vicinity of the type locality in southern Gansu, it has since been recorded additionally from the southwestern part of the province, close to the border with Qinghai province, and from a single location in the east of the Tibet Autonomous Region.

== Status ==
The International Union for Conservation of Nature does not have enough information on this species to rate its conservation status, and has listed it as being "data deficient". It is listed as "vulnerable" in the Chinese Red List.
