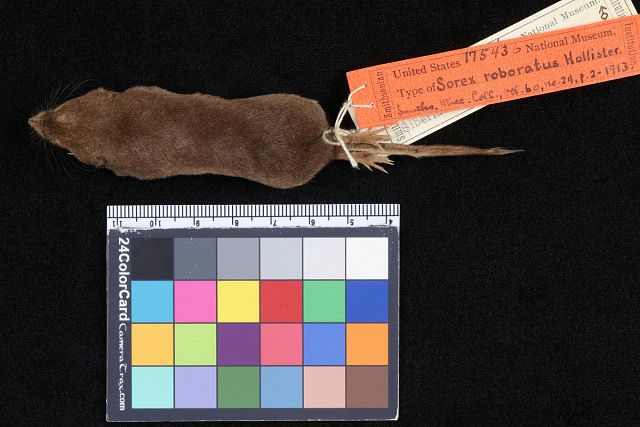
- Sorex roboratus specimen with tail measurement

Conservation status
- Least Concern (IUCN 3.1)

Scientific classification
- Kingdom: Animalia
- Phylum: Chordata
- Class: Mammalia
- Order: Eulipotyphla
- Family: Soricidae
- Genus: Sorex
- Species: S. roboratus

Binomial name
- Sorex roboratus Hollister, 1913
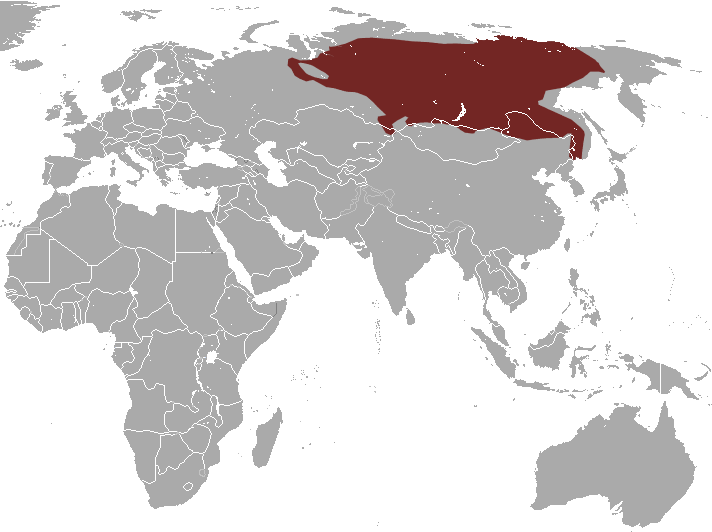
- Flat-skulled shrew range

= Flat-skulled shrew =

Species of mammal

The flat-skulled shrew (Sorex roboratus) is a species of mammal in the family Soricidae. It is found in Mongolia, China and Russia.
