= Dneper common shrew =

Conservation status
- Data Deficient (IUCN 2.3)

Scientific classification
- Domain: Eukaryota
- Kingdom: Animalia
- Phylum: Chordata
- Class: Mammalia
- Order: Eulipotyphla
- Family: Soricidae
- Genus: Sorex
- Species: S. averini

Binomial name
- Sorex averini Zubko, 1937

Species of mammal

The Dneper common shrew (Sorex averini) is a species of mammal in the family Soricidae.
