= Siberian large-toothed shrew =

Conservation status
- Least Concern (IUCN 3.1)

Scientific classification
- Kingdom: Animalia
- Phylum: Chordata
- Class: Mammalia
- Order: Eulipotyphla
- Family: Soricidae
- Genus: Sorex
- Species: S. daphaenodon

Binomial name
- Sorex daphaenodon Thomas, 1907
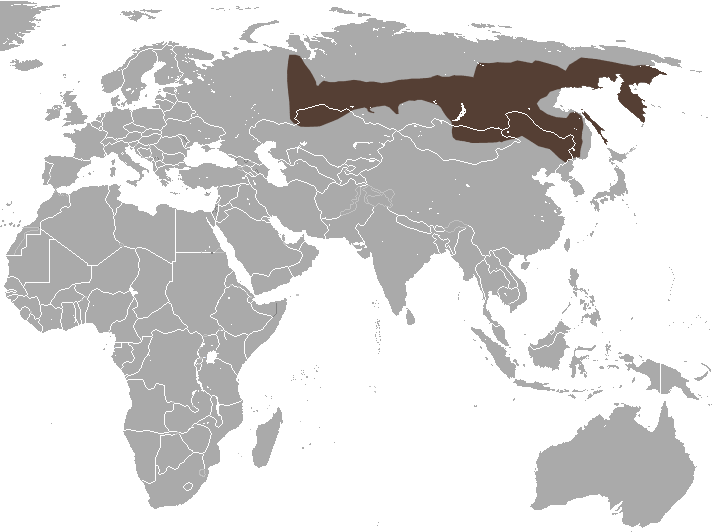
- Siberian large-toothed shrew range

Species of mammal

The Siberian large-toothed shrew (Sorex daphaenodon) is a species of shrew. An adult Siberian large-toothed shrew has a weight of 4.6–6.0 g (0.16–0.21 oz) and a body length of 5.5–6.4 cm (2.2–2.5 in), with a tail of 2.4–3.8 cm (0.94–1.50 in). This species is found across Northeast Asia, from Mongolia through northeastern China to the Russian Far East and the Paektusan region of North Korea.
