= Ixtlan shrew =

Conservation status
- Data Deficient (IUCN 3.1)

Scientific classification
- Kingdom: Animalia
- Phylum: Chordata
- Class: Mammalia
- Order: Eulipotyphla
- Family: Soricidae
- Genus: Sorex
- Species: S. ixtlanensis

Binomial name
- Sorex ixtlanensis Carraway, 2007

Species of mammal

The Ixtlan shrew (Sorex ixtlanensis) is a species of mammal in the family Soricidae. It is found in southern Mexico.
