= Saussure's shrew =

Conservation status
- Least Concern (IUCN 3.1)

Scientific classification
- Kingdom: Animalia
- Phylum: Chordata
- Class: Mammalia
- Order: Eulipotyphla
- Family: Soricidae
- Genus: Sorex
- Species: S. saussurei

Binomial name
- Sorex saussurei Merriam, 1892
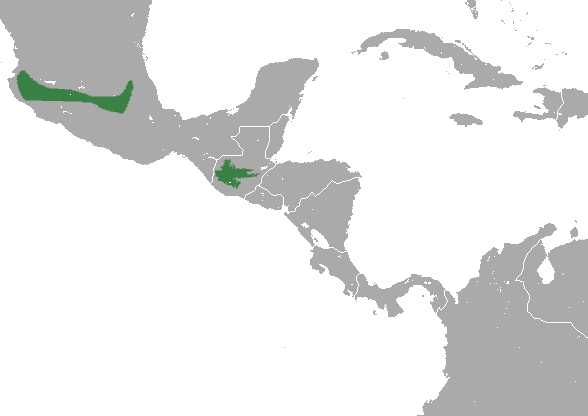
- Saussure's shrew range

Species of mammal

Saussure's shrew (Sorex saussurei) is a species of mammal in the family Soricidae, that is found in Mexico. There is also a disjointed population of shrews in Guatemala that is provisionally assigned to this species, but may represent a distinct species.
