= Lesser striped shrew =

Conservation status
- Least Concern (IUCN 3.1)

Scientific classification
- Kingdom: Animalia
- Phylum: Chordata
- Class: Mammalia
- Order: Eulipotyphla
- Family: Soricidae
- Genus: Sorex
- Species: S. bedfordiae

Binomial name
- Sorex bedfordiae Thomas, 1911
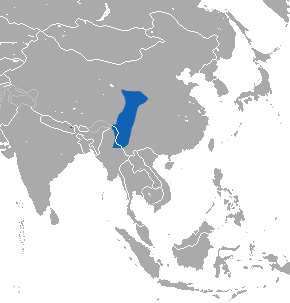
- Lesser striped shrew range

Species of mammal

The lesser striped shrew (Sorex bedfordiae) is a species of mammal in the family Soricidae. It is found in China, Myanmar, and Nepal.

== Habitat ==
In Nepal it is found in montane forests and alpine areas (above 4,000 m asl). In China it can be found at lower elevations (3,500 m asl) in the rhododendron-conifer zone. It lives in the ground litter, and forages on insects.
