= Tien Shan shrew =

Conservation status
- Least Concern (IUCN 3.1)

Scientific classification
- Kingdom: Animalia
- Phylum: Chordata
- Class: Mammalia
- Order: Eulipotyphla
- Family: Soricidae
- Genus: Sorex
- Species: S. asper

Binomial name
- Sorex asper Thomas, 1914
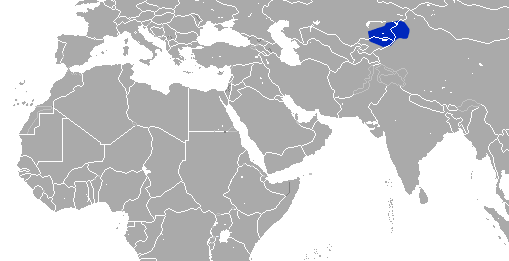
- Tien Shan Shrew range

Species of mammal

The Tien Shan shrew (Sorex asper) is a species of mammal in the family Soricidae. It is found in China and Kazakhstan.
