= Greater stripe-backed shrew =

Conservation status
- Least Concern (IUCN 3.1)

Scientific classification
- Kingdom: Animalia
- Phylum: Chordata
- Class: Mammalia
- Order: Eulipotyphla
- Family: Soricidae
- Genus: Sorex
- Species: S. cylindricauda

Binomial name
- Sorex cylindricauda Milne-Edwards, 1872
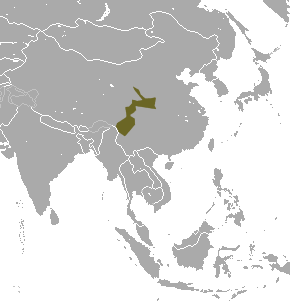
- Stripe-backed shrew range

Species of mammal

The greater stripe-backed shrew or stripe-backed shrew (Sorex cylindricauda) is a species of mammal in the family Soricidae. It is endemic to China.
