= Sclater's shrew =

Conservation status
- Critically Endangered (IUCN 3.1)

Scientific classification
- Kingdom: Animalia
- Phylum: Chordata
- Class: Mammalia
- Order: Eulipotyphla
- Family: Soricidae
- Genus: Sorex
- Species: S. sclateri

Binomial name
- Sorex sclateri Merriam, 1897
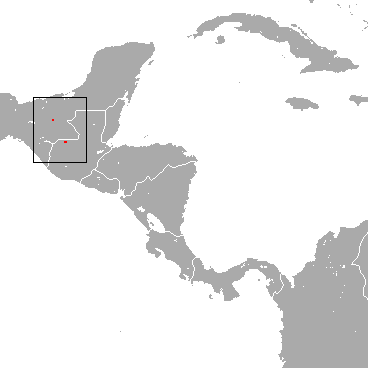
- Sclater's shrew range

Species of mammal

Sclater's shrew (Sorex sclateri) is a species of mammal in the family Soricidae. It is endemic to Mexico.

Sclater's shrew is known only from two locations in Chiapas, the type locality in Tumbala at 1,700 m (5,600 ft) elevation, and from one other location near the border with Guatemala. The area of the type locality is only 7 km^{2}, considering the habitat availability. Its habitat is montane cloud forest.

== Sources ==
- Cuarón, A.D. & de Grammont, P.C. (2008). "Sorex sclateri". IUCN Red List of Threatened Species. 2008 e.T20394A9195449. doi:10.2305/IUCN.UK.2008.RLTS.T20394A9195449.en.
