= Caucasian shrew =

Conservation status
- Least Concern (IUCN 3.1)

Scientific classification
- Kingdom: Animalia
- Phylum: Chordata
- Class: Mammalia
- Order: Eulipotyphla
- Family: Soricidae
- Genus: Sorex
- Species: S. satunini

Binomial name
- Sorex satunini Ognev, 1922
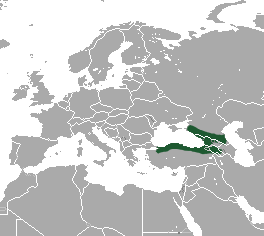
- Caucasian Shrew range

Species of mammal

The Caucasian shrew (Sorex satunini) is a species of mammal in the family Soricidae. It is found in Armenia, Russia and Turkey.
