= Jalisco shrew =

Conservation status
- Least Concern (IUCN 3.1)

Scientific classification
- Kingdom: Animalia
- Phylum: Chordata
- Class: Mammalia
- Order: Eulipotyphla
- Family: Soricidae
- Genus: Sorex
- Species: S. mediopua

Binomial name
- Sorex mediopua Carraway, 2007

Species of mammal

The Jalisco shrew (Sorex mediopua) is a species of mammal in the family Soricidae. It is found in southern Mexico.
