= Paramushir shrew =

Conservation status
- Data Deficient (IUCN 3.1)

Scientific classification
- Kingdom: Animalia
- Phylum: Chordata
- Class: Mammalia
- Order: Eulipotyphla
- Family: Soricidae
- Genus: Sorex
- Species: S. leucogaster

Binomial name
- Sorex leucogaster Kuroda, 1933
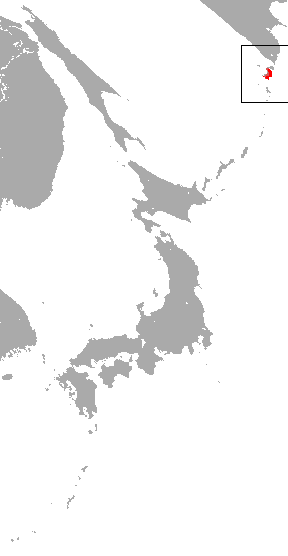
- Paramushir Shrew range

Species of mammal

The Paramushir shrew (Sorex leucogaster) is a species of mammal in the family Soricidae. It is endemic to Russia. Its natural habitat is temperate forests. It is likely named for Paramushir Island, home to several other species of shrew in the genus Sorex.
