= Portenko's shrew =

Conservation status
- Data Deficient (IUCN 3.1)

Scientific classification
- Kingdom: Animalia
- Phylum: Chordata
- Class: Mammalia
- Order: Eulipotyphla
- Family: Soricidae
- Genus: Sorex
- Species: S. portenkoi

Binomial name
- Sorex portenkoi Stroganov, 1956
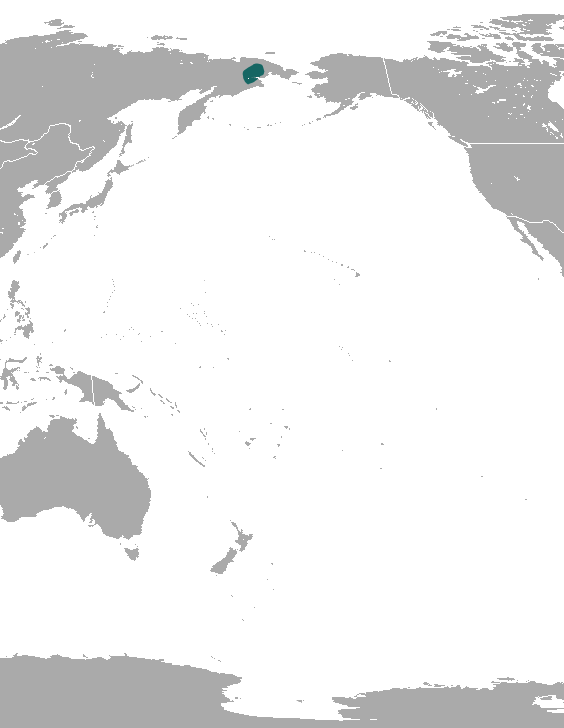
- Portenko's shrew range

Species of mammal

Portenko's shrew (Sorex portenkoi) is a species of mammal in the family Soricidae that is endemic to Russia.
