= Ussuri shrew =

Conservation status
- Data Deficient (IUCN 3.1)

Scientific classification
- Kingdom: Animalia
- Phylum: Chordata
- Class: Mammalia
- Order: Eulipotyphla
- Family: Soricidae
- Genus: Sorex
- Species: S. mirabilis

Binomial name
- Sorex mirabilis Ognev, 1937
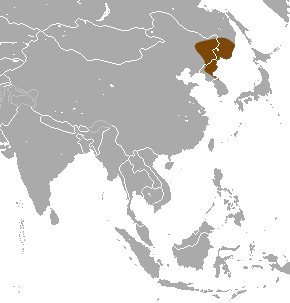
- Ussuri shrew range

Species of mammal

The Ussuri shrew (Sorex mirabilis), also known as the giant shrew, is a species of shrew found in Northeast Asia. An adult Ussuri shrew has a total length including the tail of 137 to 170 mm (5.4 to 6.7 in). It is found in valleys and on the forested slopes of mountains in the Korean Peninsula, northeastern China, and the Russian Far East. It is rarely observed, and its ecology is largely unknown.

== Description ==
It is the largest shrew in the genus Sorex, and grows to a head-and-body length of 74 to 97 mm (2.9 to 3.8 in) with a tail of 63 to 73 mm (2.5 to 2.9 in). The hind foot is 16 to 18 mm (0.6 to 0.7 in) long and the weight is 11 to 14 g (0.4 to 0.5 oz). Both the dorsal pelage and the underparts are iron grey. The large size, robust tail and various details of the dentition help to distinguish this shrew from other species.

== Distribution and habitat ==
The Ussuri shrew is native to northeastern China, northeastern Korea and southeastern Russia. It inhabits both broadleaf and mixed coniferous/broadleaved forests in valleys and on hillsides, and is present on mountains in South Korea at altitudes of over 1,500 m (5,000 ft). It prefers moist locations and also occurs in marshes at higher altitudes.

== Ecology ==
The Ussuri shrew is a terrestrial species and creates burrows. Although it also eats insects, other invertebrates and carrion, about 82% of its diet consists of earthworms, and because of their relatively low nutritional value, it needs to eat more than twice its bodyweight each day. It is presumed to nest underground but its breeding habits are little known. There is normally one litter per year and by August, the young are sometimes caught in traps. A second litter may be born when circumstances permit, and the young become sexually mature at 11 months of age.

== Status ==
The International Union for Conservation of Nature does not have enough information on this species to rate its conservation status, and has listed it as being "data deficient". However, the Ussuri shrew has a wide range and, despite being a rarely seen and poorly known species, when more information becomes available, it may turn out to be of "least concern".
