= Olympic shrew =

Conservation status
- Least Concern (IUCN 3.1)

Scientific classification
- Kingdom: Animalia
- Phylum: Chordata
- Class: Mammalia
- Infraclass: Placentalia
- Order: Eulipotyphla
- Family: Soricidae
- Genus: Sorex
- Species: S. rohweri

Binomial name
- Sorex rohweri Rausch, Feagin, & Rausch, 2007
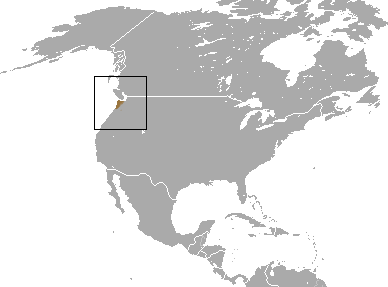
- Olympic shrew range

Species of mammal

The Olympic shrew (Sorex rohweri) is a rare species of shrew that lives in only 13 spots in northwest Washington state and, a recent discovery, in Burns Bog, located in Delta, BC.

Not much is known about this species. It was only described in 2007 and is often mistaken for the masked shrew, Sorex cinereus. Recent reexaminations of museum specimens show the species occurs in British Columbia in the Fraser Valley south of the Fraser River, east to Chilliwack Lake.

== Survival ==
Its survival in Canada is threatened by the South Fraser Perimeter Road, part 2 of the Gateway Program.
