= Veracruz shrew =

Conservation status
- Least Concern (IUCN 3.1)

Scientific classification
- Kingdom: Animalia
- Phylum: Chordata
- Class: Mammalia
- Order: Eulipotyphla
- Family: Soricidae
- Genus: Sorex
- Species: S. veraecrucis

Binomial name
- Sorex veraecrucis Jackson, 1925
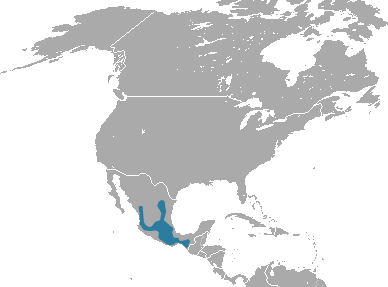
- Veracruz shrew range

Species of mammal

The Veracruz shrew (Sorex veraecrucis) is a species of mammal in the family Soricidae. It is found in Mexico.

The Veracruz shrew is critically endangered as well as endemic to the cloud forests of Los Tuxtlas in Veracruz, Mexico. With warmer temperatures and increased rainfall it is believed that the Veracruz Shrew could possible go extinct by the year 2050.
