= Chinese shrew =

Conservation status
- Data Deficient (IUCN 3.1)

Scientific classification
- Kingdom: Animalia
- Phylum: Chordata
- Class: Mammalia
- Order: Eulipotyphla
- Family: Soricidae
- Genus: Sorex
- Species: S. sinalis

Binomial name
- Sorex sinalis Thomas, 1912
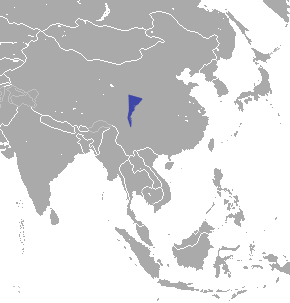
- Chinese shrew range

Species of mammal

The Chinese shrew or dusky shrew (Sorex sinalis) is a species of mammal in the family Soricidae. It is endemic to China, where it occurs in Gansu, Sichuan (including Jiuzhaigou), and Shaanxi. Its natural habitat is subtropical or tropical dry forest.
