= Kashmir pygmy shrew =

Conservation status
- Least Concern (IUCN 3.1)

Scientific classification
- Kingdom: Animalia
- Phylum: Chordata
- Class: Mammalia
- Order: Eulipotyphla
- Family: Soricidae
- Genus: Sorex
- Species: S. planiceps

Binomial name
- Sorex planiceps Miller, 1911
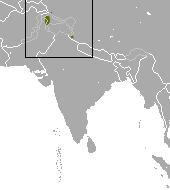
- Kashmir pygmy shrew range

Species of mammal

The Kashmir pygmy shrew (Sorex planiceps) is a species of mammal in the family Soricidae. It is found in India and Pakistan.
