= Udine shrew =

Conservation status
- Data Deficient (IUCN 3.1)

Scientific classification
- Domain: Eukaryota
- Kingdom: Animalia
- Phylum: Chordata
- Class: Mammalia
- Order: Eulipotyphla
- Family: Soricidae
- Genus: Sorex
- Species: S. arunchi

Binomial name
- Sorex arunchi Lapini and Testone 1998
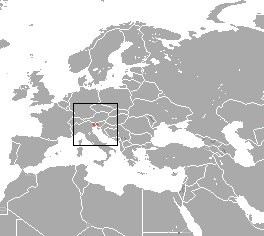
- Udine shrew range

Species of mammal

The Udine shrew (Sorex arunchi) is a species of mammal in the family Soricidae. It is found in the Udine province of north-east Italy and in western Slovenia.
