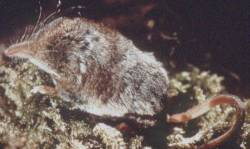
- Cinereous shrew (Sorex cinereus)

Scientific classification
- Kingdom: Animalia
- Phylum: Chordata
- Class: Mammalia
- Order: Eulipotyphla
- Family: Soricidae
- Subfamily: Soricinae
- Tribe: Soricini; G. Fischer, 1814
- Genus: Sorex; Linnaeus, 1758

Type species
- Sorex araneus Linnaeus, 1758

Species
- See text

Synonyms
- Microsorex

= Sorex =

Sorex Temporal range: Late Miocene to recent

Genus of mammals

The genus Sorex includes many of the common shrews of Eurasia and North America, and contains at least 142 known species and subspecies. Members of this genus, known as long-tailed shrews, are the only members of the tribe Soricini of the subfamily Soricinae (red-toothed shrews). They have 32 teeth.

These animals have long, pointed snouts, small ears, which are often not visible, and scent glands located on the sides of their bodies. As their eyesight is generally poor, they rely on hearing and smell to locate their prey, mainly insects. Some species also use echolocation. Distinguishing between species without examining the dental pattern is often difficult.

In some species, a female shrew and her dependent young form "caravans", in which each shrew grasps the rear of the shrew in front, when changing location.

== Species ==
- Genus Sorex – most basal of the genera
  - Kashmir pygmy shrew (S. planiceps) – India and Pakistan
  - Tibetan shrew (S. thibetanus) – endemic to China
- Subgenus Otisorex – mostly North American shrews with a few species found on the Kamchatka Peninsula and islands in the Bering Sea.
  - Chiapan shrew (S. chiapensis)
  - Cruz's long-tailed shrew (S. cruzi)
  - Long-tailed shrew (S. dispar)
    - Sorex dispar blitchi
    - Sorex dispar dispar
  - Western pygmy shrew (S. eximius)
    - Sorex eximius eximius
    - Sorex eximius montanus
  - Smoky shrew (S. fumeus)
    - Sorex fumeus fumeus
    - Sorex fumeus umbrosus
  - Eastern pygmy shrew (S. hoyi)
    - Sorex hoyi alnorum
    - Sorex hoyi hoyi
    - Sorex hoyi thompsoni
    - Sorex hoyi winnemana
  - Ibarra shrew (S. ibarrai)
  - Large-toothed shrew (S. macrodon)
  - Sierra shrew (S. madrensis)
  - McCarthy's shrew (S. mccarthyi)
  - Carmen Mountain shrew (S. milleri)
  - Mutable shrew (S. mutabilis)
  - Dwarf shrew (S. nanus)
  - Mexican long-tailed shrew (S. oreopolus)
  - Orizaba long-tailed shrew (S. orizabae)
  - Ornate shrew (S. ornatus)
    - Sorex ornatus juncensis
    - S. o. lagunae
    - S. o. ornatus
    - S. o. relictus
    - S. o. salarius
    - S. o. salicornicus
    - S. o. sinuosus
    - S. o. willetti
  - Inyo shrew (S. tenellus)
  - Verapaz shrew (S. veraepacis)
  - Ixtlan shrew (Sorex ixtlanensis)
  - S. vagrans complex
    - Glacier Bay water shrew (S. alaskanus)
    - Eastern water shrew (S. albibarbis)
      - S. a. gloveralleni
      - S. a. labradorensis
      - S. a. punctulatus
      - S. a. turneri
    - Baird's shrew (S. bairdi)
      - S. b. bairdi
      - S. b. permiliensis
    - Marsh shrew (S. bendirii)
      - S. b. albiventer
      - S. b. bendirii
      - S. b. palmeri
    - Montane shrew (S. monticola)
      - S. m. calvertensis
      - S. m. insularis
      - S. m. isolatus
      - S. m. longicaudus
      - S. m. malitiosus
      - S. m. parvidens
      - S. m. prevostensis
      - S. m. setosus
    - New Mexico shrew (S. neomexicanus)
    - Northern montane shrew (S. obscurus)
      - S. m. alascensis
      - S. m. elassodon
      - S. m. obscurus
      - S. m. shumaginensis
      - S. m. soperi
    - Pacific shrew (S. pacificus)
      - S. p. pacificus
      - S. p. cascadensis
    - Western water shrew (S. navigator)
      - S. n. brooksi
      - S. n. navigator
    - American water shrew (S. palustris)
      - S. p. hydrobadistes
      - S. p. palustris
    - Fog shrew (S. sonomae)
      - S. s. sonomae
      - S. s. tenelliodus
    - Vagrant shrew (S. vagrans)
      - S. v. halicoetes
      - S. v. paludivagus
      - S. v. vagrans
  - S. cinereus group
    - Kamchatka shrew (S. camtschaticus)
    - Cinereous shrew (S. cinereus)
      - S. c. acadicus
      - S. c. cinereus
      - S. c. hollisteri
      - S. c. lesueurii
      - S. c. miscix
      - S. c. ohioensis
      - S. c. streatori
    - Maryland shrew (S. fontinalis)
    - Prairie shrew (S. haydeni)
    - Saint Lawrence Island shrew (S. jacksoni)
    - Paramushir shrew (S. leucogaster)
    - Southeastern shrew (S. longirostris)
    - Mount Lyell shrew (S. lyelli)
    - Portenko's shrew (S. portenkoi)
    - Preble's shrew (S. preblei)
    - Pribilof Island shrew (S. pribilofensis)
    - Olympic shrew (S. rohweri)
    - Barren ground shrew (S. ugyunak)
- Subgenus Sorex
  - Dneper common shrew (S. averini)
  - Lesser striped shrew (S. bedfordiae)
  - Greater stripe-backed shrew (S. cylindricauda)
  - Chinese highland shrew (S. excelsus)
  - Azumi shrew (S. hosonoi)
  - Chinese shrew (S. sinalis)
  - Alaska tiny shrew (S. yukonicus)
  - S. alpinus group
    - Alpine shrew (S. alpinus)
    - Ussuri shrew (S. mirabilis)
  - S. araneus group
    - Valais shrew (S. antinorii)
    - Common shrew (S. araneus)
    - Udine shrew (S. arunchi)
    - Crowned shrew (S. coronatus)
    - Siberian large-toothed shrew (S. daphaenodon)
      - S. d. daphaenodon
      - S. d. sanguinidens
      - S. d. scaloni
    - Iberian shrew (S. granarius)
    - Caucasian shrew (S. satunini)
  - S. arcticus group
    - Arctic shrew (S. arcticus)
      - S. a. arcticus
      - S. a. laricorum
    - Maritime shrew (S. maritimensis)
  - S. tundrensis
    - Tien Shan shrew (S. asper)
    - Gansu shrew (S. cansulus)
    - Tundra shrew (S. tundrensis)
  - S. minutus group
    - Buchara shrew (S. buchariensis)
    - Kozlov's shrew (S. kozlovi)
    - Caucasian pygmy shrew (S. volnuchini)
      - S. v. dahli
      - S. v. volnuchini
  - S. caecutiens group
    - Laxmann's shrew (S. caecutiens)
    - Taiga shrew (S. isodon)
    - Eurasian least shrew (S. minutissimus)
    - Eurasian pygmy shrew (S. minutus)
    - Flat-skulled shrew (S. roboratus)
    - Shinto shrew (S. shinto)
      - S. s. sadonis
      - S. s. shikokensis
      - S. s. shinto
    - Long-clawed shrew (S. unguiculatus)
  - S. gracillimus group
    - Slender shrew (S. gracillimus)
  - S. raddei
    - Radde's shrew (S. raddei)
  - S. samniticus
    - Apennine shrew (S. samniticus)
- Subgenus incertae sedis
  - Alto shrew (S. altoensis) – Mexico
  - Arizona shrew (S. arizonae) – United States (Arizona, New Mexico) Mexico (Chihuahua)
  - Zacatecas shrew (S. emarginatus) – Mexico
  - Jalisco shrew (S. mediopua) – Mexico
  - Merriam's shrew (S. merriami) – Western United States (Washington, Oregon, California, Idaho, Nevada, Utah, Arizona, New Mexico, Wyoming, Colorado)
  - Saussure's shrew (S. saussurei) – Mexico and Guatemala
    - S. s. godmani
    - S. s. saussurei
  - Salvin's shrew (S. salvini) – Mexico and Guatemala
  - Sclater's shrew (S. sclateri) – Mexico
  - San Cristobal shrew (S. stizodon) – Mexico
  - Trowbridge's shrew (S. trowbridgii) – Pacific Coast United States (Washington, Oregon, California) Canada (southern British Columbia)
    - S. t. destructioni
    - S. t. humboldtensis
    - S. t. mariposae
    - S. t. montereyensis
    - S. t. trowbridgii
  - Chestnut-bellied shrew (S. ventralis) – Mexico
  - Veracruz shrew (S. veraecrucis) – Mexico
    - S. v. oaxacae
    - S. v. veraecrucis
