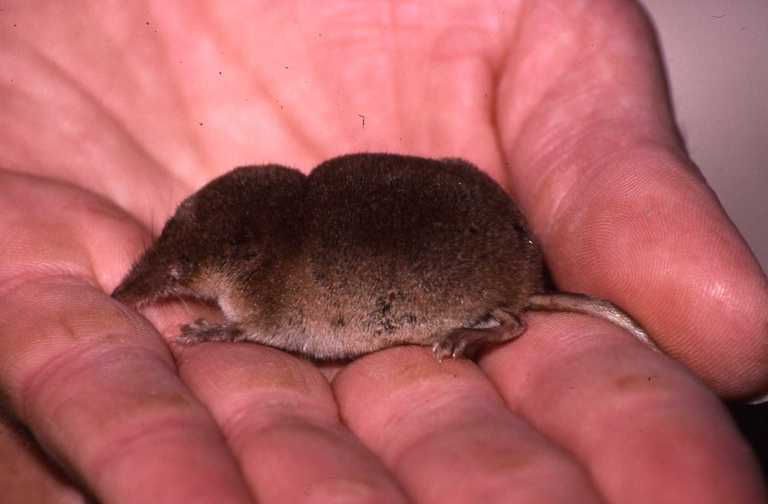

Conservation status
- Least Concern (IUCN 3.1)

Scientific classification
- Kingdom: Animalia
- Phylum: Chordata
- Class: Mammalia
- Order: Eulipotyphla
- Family: Soricidae
- Genus: Sorex
- Species: S. coronatus

Binomial name
- Sorex coronatus Millet, 1828
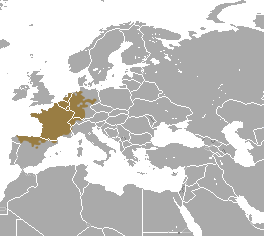
- Crowned shrew range

= Crowned shrew =

Species of mammal

The crowned shrew or Millet's shrew (Sorex coronatus) is a species of mammal in the family Soricidae. It is found in Austria, Belgium, France, Germany, Liechtenstein, the Netherlands, Spain, Switzerland, and the British island of Jersey. It is almost indistinguishable from the common shrew; its habits and habitats are identical. However it has a different karyotype, is slightly smaller, and has small morphological differences, such as a longer rostrum (upper tooth-row and mandible) relative to length of skull.
