= Zacatecas shrew =

Conservation status
- Least Concern (IUCN 3.1)

Scientific classification
- Kingdom: Animalia
- Phylum: Chordata
- Class: Mammalia
- Order: Eulipotyphla
- Family: Soricidae
- Genus: Sorex
- Species: S. emarginatus

Binomial name
- Sorex emarginatus Jackson, 1925
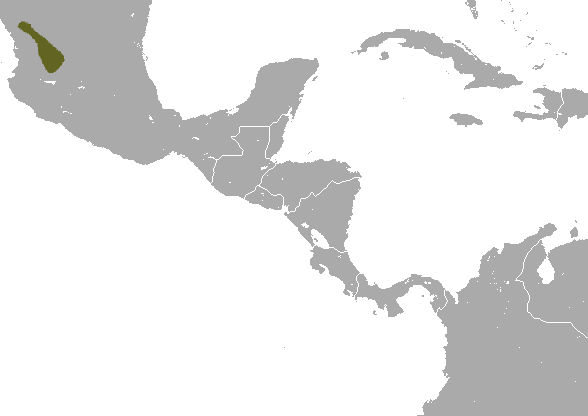
- Zacatecas shrew range

Species of mammal

The Zacatecas shrew (Sorex emarginatus) is a species of mammal in the family Soricidae. It is endemic to Mexico. It inhabits the southeastern Sierra Madre Occidental in the states of Durango, Zacatecas, and Jalisco, from 1,830 to 3,660 m (6,000 to 12,010 ft) elevation.
