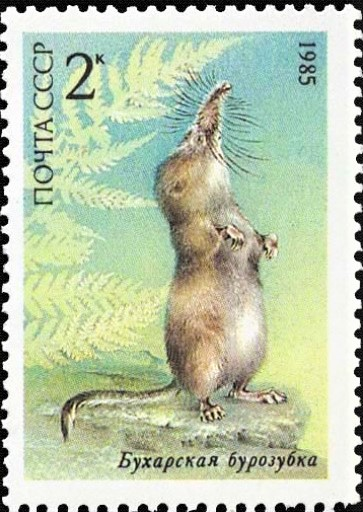
- on a 1985 stamp of the Soviet Union

Conservation status
- Data Deficient (IUCN 3.1)

Scientific classification
- Kingdom: Animalia
- Phylum: Chordata
- Class: Mammalia
- Order: Eulipotyphla
- Family: Soricidae
- Genus: Sorex
- Species: S. buchariensis

Binomial name
- Sorex buchariensis Ognev, 1921
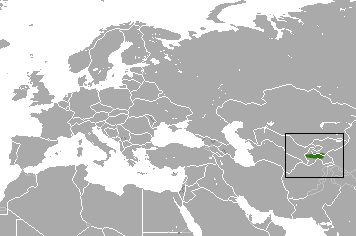
- Buchara shrew range

= Buchara shrew =

Species of mammal

The Buchara shrew or Pamir shrew (Sorex buchariensis) is a species of mammal in the family Soricidae. It is found in the Pamir Mountains in Tajikistan, Kyrgyzstan, and Uzbekistan. It lives in mountain birch and poplar forests on slopes and piedmonts.
