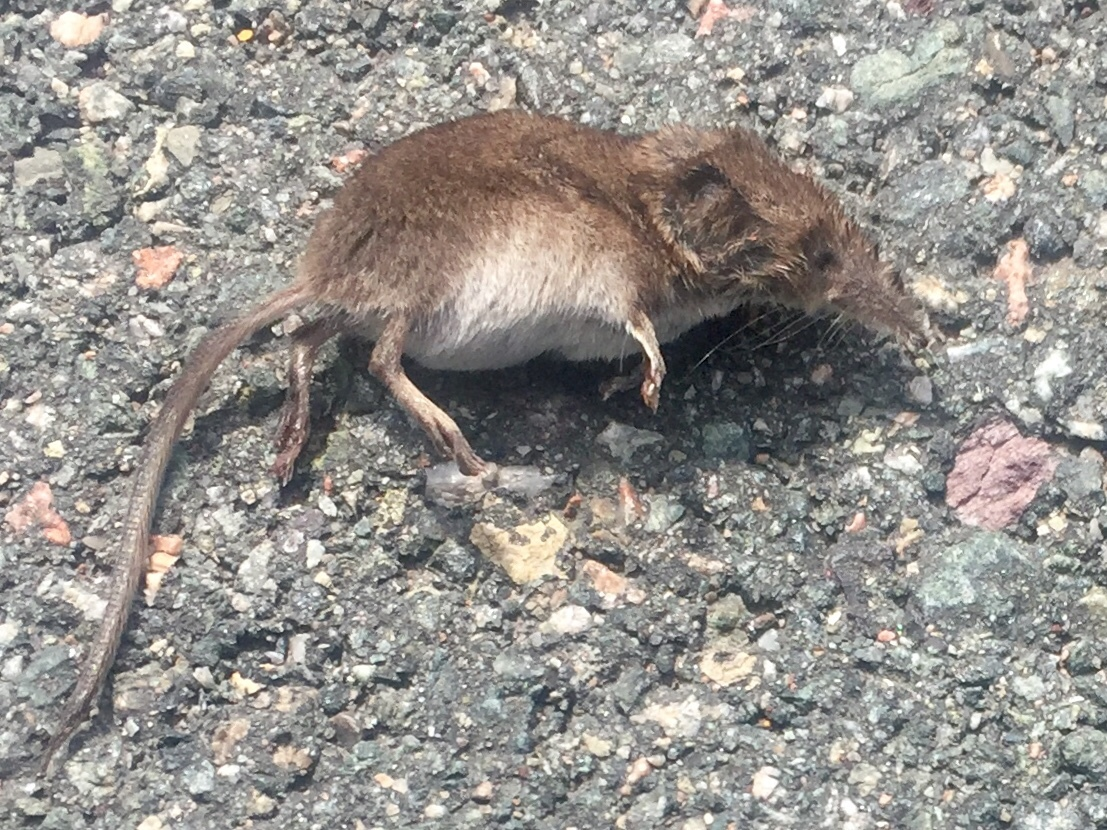

Conservation status
- Least Concern (IUCN 3.1)

Scientific classification
- Kingdom: Animalia
- Phylum: Chordata
- Class: Mammalia
- Order: Eulipotyphla
- Family: Soricidae
- Genus: Sorex
- Species: S. maritimensis

Binomial name
- Sorex maritimensis Smith, 1939
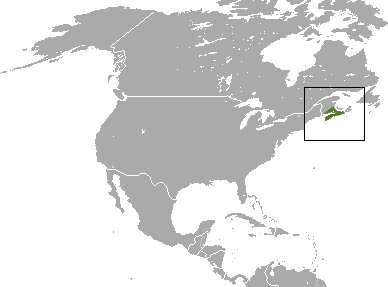
- Maritime shrew range

= Maritime shrew =

Species of mammal

The maritime shrew (Sorex maritimensis) is a species of mammal in the family Soricidae. It is found in New Brunswick and Nova Scotia in Canada.
