= Chinese highland shrew =

Conservation status
- Least Concern (IUCN 3.1)

Scientific classification
- Kingdom: Animalia
- Phylum: Chordata
- Class: Mammalia
- Order: Eulipotyphla
- Family: Soricidae
- Genus: Sorex
- Species: S. excelsus

Binomial name
- Sorex excelsus G. M. Allen, 1923
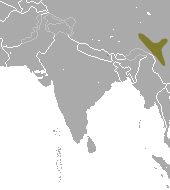
- Chinese highland shrew range

Species of mammal

The Chinese highland shrew (Sorex excelsus) is a species of shrew in the family Soricidae. It is found in China.
