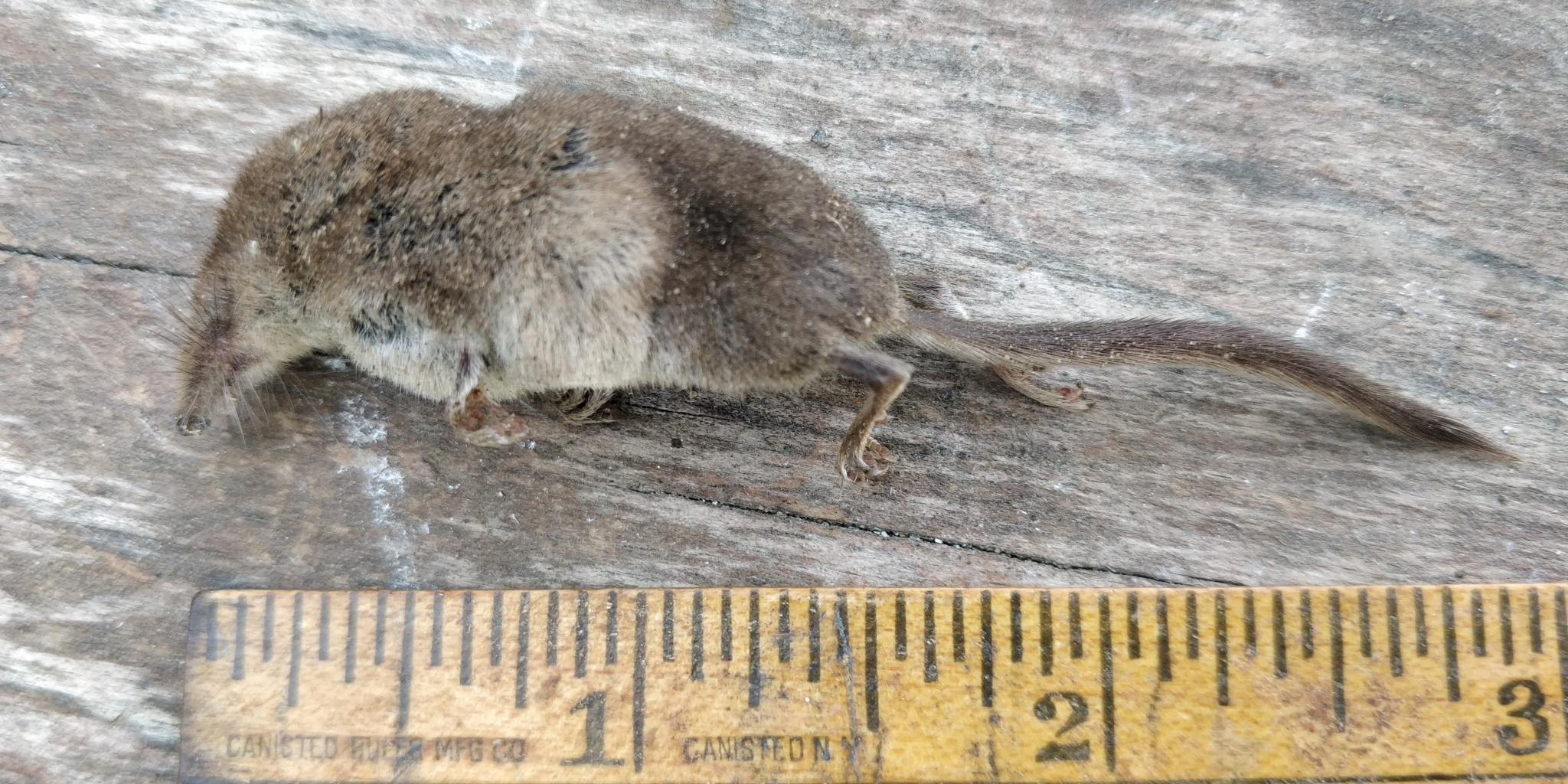

Conservation status
- Least Concern (IUCN 3.1)

Scientific classification
- Kingdom: Animalia
- Phylum: Chordata
- Class: Mammalia
- Order: Eulipotyphla
- Family: Soricidae
- Genus: Sorex
- Species: S. haydeni

Binomial name
- Sorex haydeni Baird, 1857
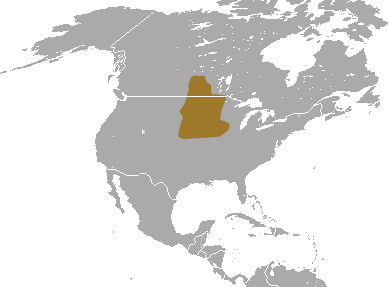
- Prairie Shrew range

= Prairie shrew =

Species of mammal

The prairie shrew (Sorex haydeni) is a small shrew found in the Canadian prairies and midwestern United States. At one time, this species was considered to be a subspecies of the similar cinereus shrew, S. cinereus.

It is brown in color with light grey underparts with a long tail. Its body is about 8 cm (3.1 in) in length including a 3 cm (1.2 in) long tail. It weighs about 4 g. This animal is found in open grasslands, often near water. It eats insects, worms, snails, small mammals and seeds. Predators include hawks, owls, snakes, and foxes. This animal is active day and night year-round. It mates between spring and fall. 3 to 6 young are born in a nest under a log or rocks.
