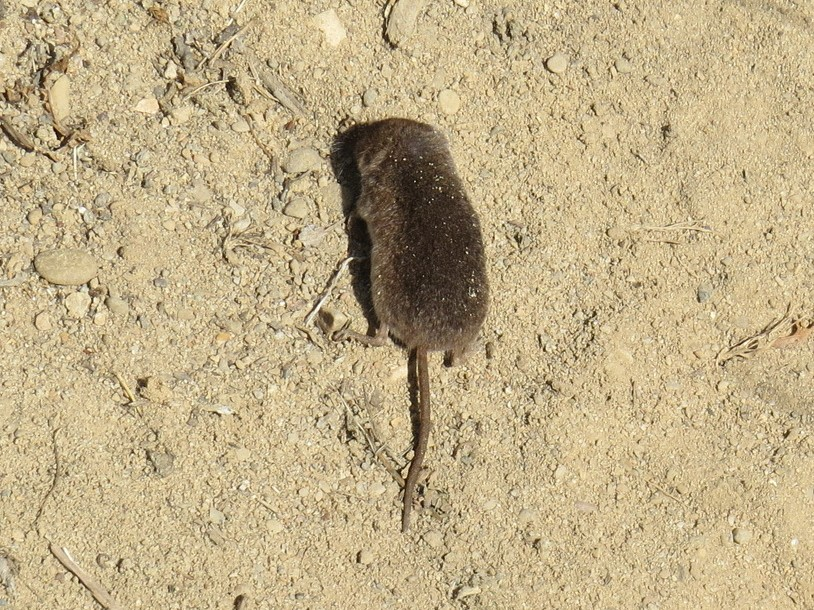

Conservation status
- Least Concern (IUCN 3.1)

Scientific classification
- Kingdom: Animalia
- Phylum: Chordata
- Class: Mammalia
- Order: Eulipotyphla
- Family: Soricidae
- Genus: Sorex
- Species: S. vagrans

Binomial name
- Sorex vagrans Baird, 1857
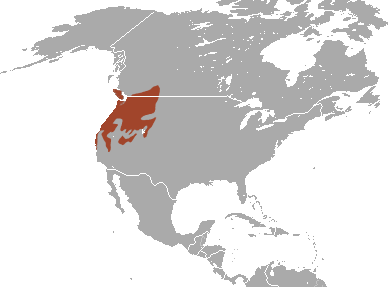
- Vagrant shrew range

= Vagrant shrew =

Species of mammal

The vagrant shrew (Sorex vagrans), also known as the wandering shrew, is a medium-sized North American shrew. At one time, the montane shrew and the Orizaba long-tailed shrew were considered to belong to the same species.

== Range and habitat ==
This animal inhabits open and wooded areas in western Canada and the United States west of the Continental Divide. In Canada, it is found in southern British Columbia, including Vancouver Island, and as far east as extreme south-western Alberta. In the United States, it is found throughout most of Washington, Oregon, and Idaho, as far south as central California, in northern and central Nevada, northern Utah, and western Montana and Wyoming.

Their preferred habitat appears to be wet grassland and meadows, ranging from alpine tundra to swampland, and they are often found close to rivers or other sources of water. They are also found in open coniferous forest, but only rarely in dense woodlands. Because they often use fallen logs as cover, they prefer areas with moderate amounts of woody debris, and they may also prefer areas with more acidic soils than other local shrew species. One subspecies is found only in salt marshes.

There are three recognised subspecies:

- Sorex vagrans halicoetes - salt marshes in central California
- Sorex vagrans paludivagus - central Californian coast
- Sorex vagrans vagrans - throughout the remainder of the range

Pleistocene fossils attributed to the species have been reported from Arkansas, New Mexico, and Texas. However, such fossils can be difficult to distinguish at the species level, and may represent close relatives such as montane or Pacific shrews.

== Description ==
Vagrant shrews are generally red brown in color with white or grey underparts, although coastal populations can be much darker, being almost black on the upper parts of the body. They have a long tail which is sometimes paler in color underneath, especially in juveniles. Although similar in appearance to other shrews found in the same area, it can be distinguished from the montane shrew by its smaller size and shorter tail, and by having a smaller number of friction pads on the hind feet. It can most readily be distinguished from Trowbridge's shrew by examining fine details of the shape of the skull, although the latter species also tends to have a more distinctly pale underside to the tail in adults.

During winter, its fur is dark brown. The fall molt occurs between September and October, beginning firstly on the rump and progressing forwards, and then, separately, on the snout, and moving backwards. The timing of the spring molt is much more variable, even in the same population, so that individuals with summer and winter coats can be found together for several months during the spring, and even into the early summer.

Its body is about 10 centimetres (3.9 in) in total length, including a 4 centimetres (1.6 in) long tail. The adult body weight ranges from 4 to 8 grams (0.14 to 0.28 oz), with males being slightly larger than females. The basal metabolic rate of vagrant shrews is 5.4 ml O_{2}/g/h, with no evidence of torpor in winter.

They are referred to sometimes as wandering shrews.

== Behavior ==
Vagrant shrews feed mainly on earthworms, spiders, insects, and other small invertebrates, but also eat some plant material. Because of their high metabolic rate, they have been reported to consume over 160% of their own body weight in food each day. Their primary predators include owls, and even bobcats.

They are active throughout the day, typically for just five to ten minutes at a time before resting. They do, however, spend longer periods of time foraging at night than they do during the hours of daylight. They are generally solitary outside the spring breeding season, defending home ranges of around 1,000 m^{2} (11,000 sq ft), by squeaking and making short charges at intruders, although actual fighting is rare. During the spring, home ranges are much larger, especially for the males.

Throughout most of the year, vagrant shrews construct shallow cup-shaped nests, up to 8 cm (3.1 in) across, from vegetation and animal hair. In winter, they cover the nests with a domed roof to provide shelter. Females also construct similar domed nests during the breeding season, in which to rear their young. These are, however, larger than the winter nests, and may reach as much as 24 cm (9.4 in) across and up to 6 cm (2.4 in) in height. Vagrant shrews sometimes use echolocation to orient themselves in unfamiliar locations, although they are probably not able to use it to locate prey.

It often uses runways created by voles.

== Reproduction ==
Vagrant shrews primarily breed between April and June, although births may occur as early as February, or as late as September. Gestation lasts twenty days, and results in the birth of a litter of two to eight young. A female may give birth to up to three litters each year. The young are born hairless and blind, weighing less than 0.5 g (0.018 oz) each. They grow rapidly throughout the first few weeks of life, beginning to develop fur by two weeks, opening their eyes by three weeks, and being weaned between sixteen and twenty five days after birth.

The average life expectancy of a vagrant shrew has been estimated at a little over six months. However, they can live much longer; although few survive for more than seventeen months, a few survive their second winter and reach two years of age.
