= Orizaba long-tailed shrew =

Conservation status
- Least Concern (IUCN 3.1)

Scientific classification
- Kingdom: Animalia
- Phylum: Chordata
- Class: Mammalia
- Order: Eulipotyphla
- Family: Soricidae
- Genus: Sorex
- Species: S. orizabae

Binomial name
- Sorex orizabae Merriam, 1895
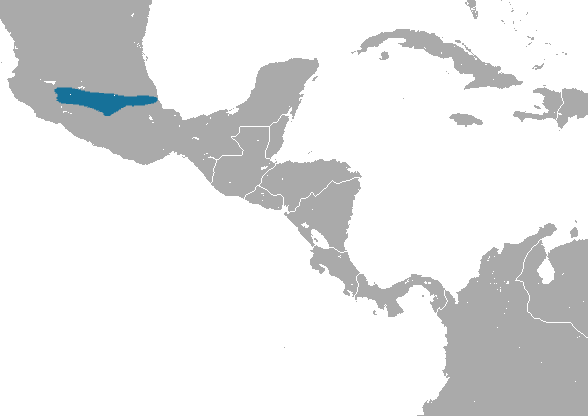
- Orizaba long-tailed shrew range

Species of mammal

The Orizaba long-tailed shrew (Sorex orizabae) is a species of mammal in the family Soricidae. It is found in the states of Federal District, México, Michoacán, Morelos, Puebla, Tlaxcala, and Veracruz in Mexico. It is named after Pico de Orizaba, the highest mountain in Mexico.
