= Chestnut-bellied shrew =

Conservation status
- Least Concern (IUCN 3.1)

Scientific classification
- Kingdom: Animalia
- Phylum: Chordata
- Class: Mammalia
- Order: Eulipotyphla
- Family: Soricidae
- Genus: Sorex
- Species: S. ventralis

Binomial name
- Sorex ventralis Merriam, 1895
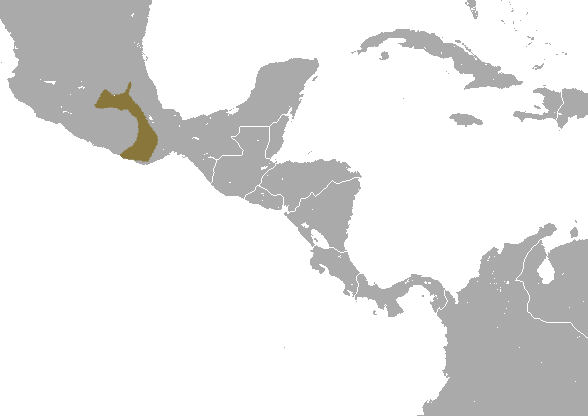
- Chestnut-bellied shrew range

Species of mammal

The chestnut-bellied shrew (Sorex ventralis) is a species of mammal in the family Soricidae. It is endemic to Mexico.
