= Mexican long-tailed shrew =

Conservation status
- Least Concern (IUCN 3.1)

Scientific classification
- Kingdom: Animalia
- Phylum: Chordata
- Class: Mammalia
- Order: Eulipotyphla
- Family: Soricidae
- Genus: Sorex
- Species: S. oreopolus

Binomial name
- Sorex oreopolus Merriam, 1892
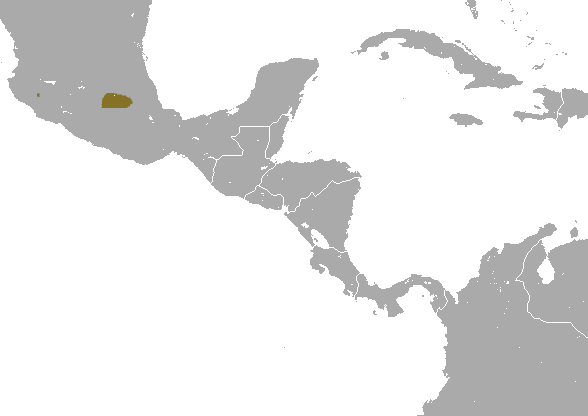
- Mexican long-tailed shrew range

Species of mammal

The Mexican long-tailed shrew (Sorex oreopolus) is a species of mammal in the family Soricidae. It is endemic to Mexico.
