= Mount Lyell shrew =

Conservation status
- Least Concern (IUCN 3.1)

- Vulnerable (NatureServe)

Scientific classification
- Kingdom: Animalia
- Phylum: Chordata
- Class: Mammalia
- Order: Eulipotyphla
- Family: Soricidae
- Genus: Sorex
- Species: S. lyelli

Binomial name
- Sorex lyelli Merriam, 1902
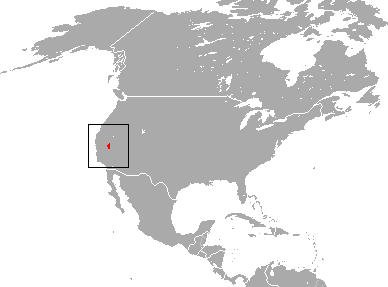
- Mount Lyell shrew range

Species of mammal

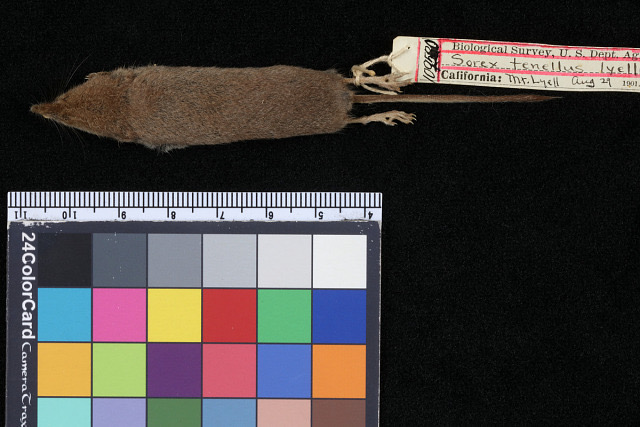
Deceased specimen of Sorex Lyelli

The Mount Lyell shrew (Sorex lyelli) is a shrew (family Sorcidae) endemic to California and found in the central Sierra Nevada and Mono County at altitudes up to 3630 meters. It is named for Mount Lyell in Yosemite National Park, where a specimen was first collected in 1901. Observations of the Mount Lyell shrew have been rare, and a specimen was only first photographed live in 2024. The Mount Lyell shrew was the last known mammal in California to be photographed live. An adult Mount Lyell shrew grows to about 8.9 to 10cm in length, including its long tail. The Mount Lyell shrew is grey-brown and externally similar to other Sierran shrews, but is distinguishable because of the shape and coloration of its teeth. The Mount Lyell shrew has been found in varied habitats which are usually near a water source in high-elevation areas in the central Sierra Nevada and parts of the eastern Sierra, and as it has not been frequently observed, its behaviors, habitat, and range are still a topic of study.

== Range ==
The Mount Lyell Shrew’s known range is limited to a small area in the Sierra Nevada of California. Its range incorporates parts of Fresno, Mariposa, Mono, and Tuolumne counties between elevations of 2,100 and 3,630 meters. While it has been observed most frequently in areas near Yosemite National Park and Mono County, some researchers have suggested that the lack of reports of the Mount Lyell shrew in the southern Sierra may be due to the difficulty of collecting specimens at over 3,000m in less frequented areas, and that the Mount Lyell Shrew may have a greater range in the Sierra Nevada than previously thought.

== Habitat ==
The Mount Lyell shrew lives in varied habitats in the Sierra Nevada between 2,100 and 3,630 meters, and is most commonly associated with sub-alpine riparian areas near fast running streams. It has also been found in high elevation wetlands, meadows, and in sagebrush-steppe communities. An early and influential account of the Mount Lyell shrew was published in 1924 by Joseph Grinnell and Tracy Irwin Storer, and this account says that the shrew’s habitat is damp. To this day, most specimens have been captured near a water source. However, Mount Lyell shrews have been captured in microhabitats with both wet and dry soils.

The habitats of the Mount Lyell shrew are currently categorized as either highly or extremely threatened by climate change. With global temperatures rising, its current environments, such as Mount Lyell itself, may not stay suitable.

== Description ==
The Mount Lyell shrew is brown to gray, sometimes almost olive brown, and is paler on its sides and belly than it is on its back. Its underparts are pale gray or pale olive-gray. It is tiny, round, and appears somewhat like a mouse with a long snout. The shrew is between 8.9 and 10 centimetres (3.5 and 3.9 in) long and weighs 4–5 grams (0.14–0.18 oz). It has 32 teeth. It is distinguishable from other Sierran shrews because the median surfaces of its unicuspid teeth are pigmented and the third unicuspid tooth is larger than the fourth.

The Mount Lyell shrew has been observed to eat a variety of small insects. Shrews generally have high metabolic rates and can eat between ½ to 2 times their bodyweight per day.

== Observations ==
In 1901, the first known specimen of a Mount Lyell Shrew was collected near Mount Lyell in Sierra Nevada of California. The shrew was subsequently first identified by biologist Clinton Hart Merriam in 1902. The Mount Lyell shrew was also observed and written about by biologist and zoologist Joseph Grinnell and Tracy Irwin Storer in 1924. However, observations of the shrew remain scarce, and in 2009, less than 40 Mount Lyell shrews had been observed by researchers.

However, in November 2024, a team of student researchers associated with the California Academy of Sciences captured photographs of the shrew alive for the first time. The team worked near the community of Lee Vining near Mono Lake, in the eastern Sierra. Previously, collecting a live specimen had been difficult because shrews need to eat around every two hours or they will die, so they often do not survive in traps. However, the student team kept watch over their traps constantly and were able to capture photographs of several Mount Lyell Shrews, as well as videos of them eating and interacting with their natural environment. The student team consisted of Vishal Subramanyan (a University of California Berkeley graduate and wildlife photographer) Prakrit Jain (a UC Berkeley biology student), and Harper Forbes (a University of Arizona student).
