= Large-toothed shrew =

Conservation status
- Vulnerable (IUCN 3.1)

Scientific classification
- Kingdom: Animalia
- Phylum: Chordata
- Class: Mammalia
- Order: Eulipotyphla
- Family: Soricidae
- Genus: Sorex
- Species: S. macrodon

Binomial name
- Sorex macrodon Merriam, 1895
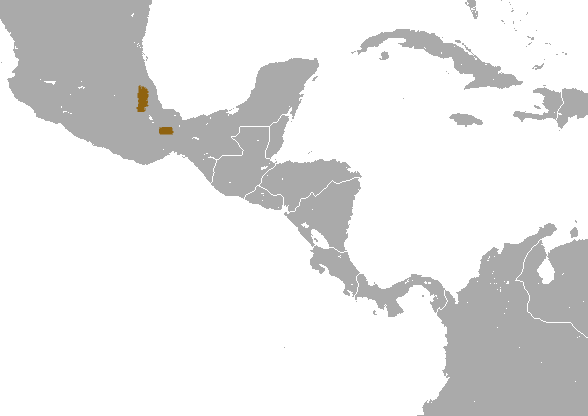
- Large-toothed shrew range

Species of mammal

The large-toothed shrew or Mexican large-toothed shrew (Sorex macrodon) is one of 77 species within the genus Sorex. Registered on the IUCN Red List as vulnerable with a decreasing population, the Mexican large-toothed shrew has been recorded only 14 times in seven locations. The shrew is a member of the red-toothed shrew subfamily Soricinae, and the more taxonomically defined tribe Soricini. Members of the latter category exhibit long tails relative to body size.

== Habitat, distribution, and survival ==
With an estimated range around 6,400 to 12,000 km^{2}, S. macrodon is endemic to Mexico and occupies mossy banks, moist cloud forest, and dense oak forests, where it may live under rocks or logs, beside streams, and in weedy vegetation. Mexican large-toothed shrews inhabit pine-oak, coniferous, and tropical forest growing inside the Trans-Mexican Volcanic Belt (TVB) within the southernmost Sierra Nevada. This natural landmark is found inside the Gulf of Mexico, and is a recognized hotspot for diversity, endemicity, and geographic transition of living biology - it boasts more than 75% of the sporadic distribution of S. macrodon. This particular species is entirely terrestrial; coincident species include: Megadontomis cryophilus, Peromyscus aztecus, and Peromyscus furvus. S. macrodon shares extensive trails with Lepus callotis, and Microtus oaxacensis, as well as mountainous territory – at altitudes of 4200 meters - along with fellow shrews S. veraepacis, S. saussurei, and S. trowbridgii. Species are micro endemic to the neotropics of Veracruz, Oaxaca, and Puebla in southern Mexico. Uninhibited destruction of local forests continues to shrink its narrow habitat. In 2005, civilian development had rendered 84% of the shrew's original range unsuitable. "Biological Conservation" records that only 15.95% of S. macrodon habitat remained ecologically intact after deforestation; less than 25% of their potential distributions endured. In farmland, shrews are likely to be affected by pesticides either through secondary contamination by the food chain or by direct exposure. Destruction of habitat boundaries, including markers such as forest limits and grass lines, diminish S. macrodon survival rates within small and sparse distribution. As a result, even small natural disasters or human interferences – such as mining operations, livestock ranching, wood-harvesting, or forest fires – could exterminate the entire population. Unfortunately, the Mexican large-toothed shrew is very poorly known, even in its native country. In summary, agriculture and urbanization pose major extinction threats to Sorex macrodon.

== Diet ==
It is mainly insectivorous, and feeds on small arthropods, arachnids, and some plant material.

== Morphology ==
The Mexican large-toothed shrew is rather large with a total length of 11.8 cm or more and a hind foot of 1.5 cm. Its pelage is a comparatively light (to other shrews in the family) mixed russet and black, with chamois colored ventral parts. The skull of S. macrodon is large and heavy with bulky teeth and reinforced margins of the anterior nostrils.

== Phylogeny ==
S. macrodon is part of the Beringean clade, one of two major clades in North America, and shows an early divergence from other North American species. S. macrodon has a cytochrome b gene sequence of 1081 base pairs, about the median range of its relatives. The Mexican large-toothed shrew is inferred to have diverged from others in its clade during the late Miocene.
