= Apennine shrew =

Conservation status
- Least Concern (IUCN 3.1)

Scientific classification
- Kingdom: Animalia
- Phylum: Chordata
- Class: Mammalia
- Order: Eulipotyphla
- Family: Soricidae
- Genus: Sorex
- Species: S. samniticus

Binomial name
- Sorex samniticus Altobello, 1926
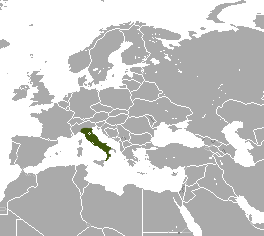
- Apennine Shrew range

Species of mammal

The Apennine shrew (Sorex samniticus) is a species of shrew in the family Soricidae.

== Taxonomy and evolution ==
Sorex samniticus was described in 1926 by Altobello. It was previously considered a subspecies of S. araneus, but separated from it in 1979. S. samniticus has a subspecies, S. samniticus garganicus, which is smaller than the standard nominate subspecies S. s. samniticus.

A genetic analysis estimated that the Apenine shrew diverged from other shrews in the genus Sorex approximately 2.7 million years, further in time than the other species of the araneus group.

== Description ==
The Apennine shrew is very similar in appearance to the common shrew (Sorex araneus), but it can be distinguished by the upper incisors.

It has 52 pairs of chromosomes, unlike other morphologically similar shrews such as the common shrew.

== Habitat, range, and conservation status ==
The Apennine shrew is endemic to Italy. It has been found from 300 metres (980 ft) to 1,160 metres (3,810 ft) above sea level. It prefers shrubland. A 2007 study found that its population decreased as the amount of Quercus cerris (a species of oak) and Castanea sativa (sweet chestnu) trees increased.

It is listed as a species of least concern by the IUCN due to its wide range and lack of known threats.
