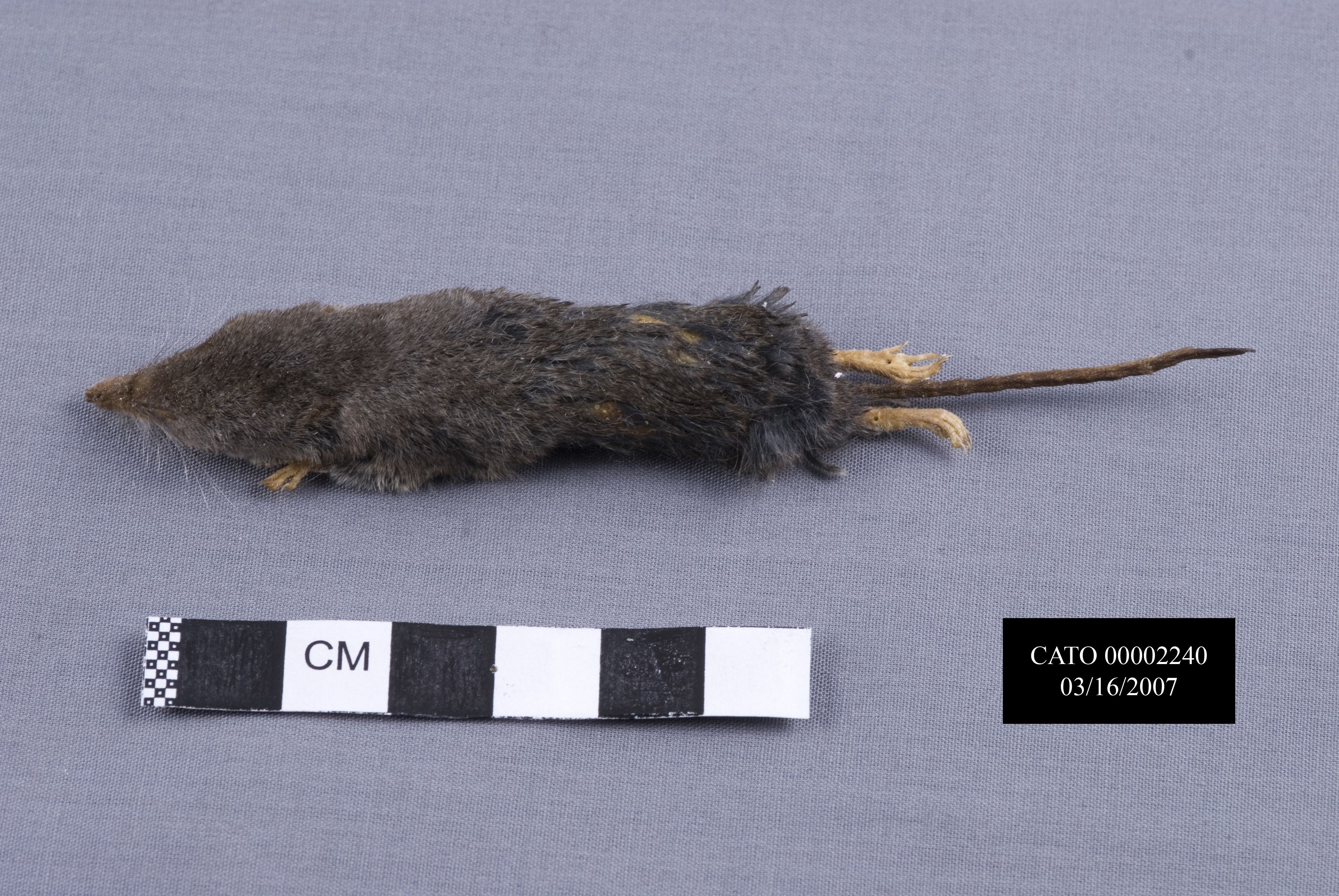
- Museum specimen

Conservation status
- Least Concern (IUCN 3.1)

Scientific classification
- Kingdom: Animalia
- Phylum: Chordata
- Class: Mammalia
- Order: Eulipotyphla
- Family: Soricidae
- Genus: Sorex
- Species: S. fumeus

Binomial name
- Sorex fumeus Miller, 1895
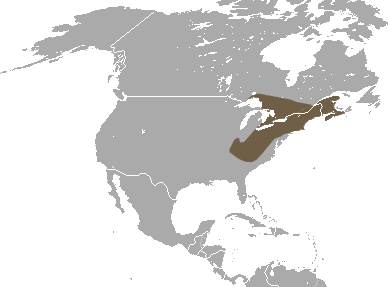
- Smoky shrew range

= Smoky shrew =

Species of mammal

The smoky shrew (Sorex fumeus) is a medium-sized North American shrew found in eastern Canada and the northeastern United States and further south along the Appalachian Mountains.

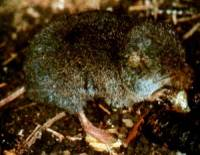
U.S. Forest Service image

== Subspecies ==
This species has two recognized subspecies:

- Sorex fumeus fumeus
- Sorex fumeus umbrosus

== Description ==
The smoky shrew is active year-round. It is dull grey in colour with lighter underparts and a long tail which is brown on top and yellowish underneath. During winter, its fur is grey. Its body is about 11 centimetres (4.3 in) in length including a 4 centimetres (1.6 in) long tail and it weighs roughly 5 grams (0.18 oz).

== Habitat and ecology ==
This animal is found near streams in cool damp deciduous and mixed woods. It makes extensive, solitary, burrows in the leaf litter on the forest floor or builds globular nests 10–15 centimetres (3.9–5.9 in) of plant materials under rocks. The smoky shrew rarely digs tunnels. It instead uses tunnels created by moles or other shrews. Its diet consists mainly of beetles, however various insects, earthworms, small rodents, snails and other soil dwelling invertebrates are also taken. It also consumes plant material to supplement its diet. Predators include owls, snakes, foxes, weasels, and mustelids.

== Reproduction ==
Smoky shrews start mating in late March, and females give birth to their first litters in April or May, about 20 days after mating. They mate again as soon as the first litter is born, and they may have two more litters, each about a month apart, if the female lives long enough. Each litter has two to eight pups, normally six. In one month, the offspring weigh around 4 grams which is half of the adult weight. Male smoky shrews do not take care of their offspring, only the female does. Females make nests in leaf litter where they give birth. The offspring are blind, helpless, and have no fur. Females nurse and protect their offspring for a short time (less than 20 days).

== Social behavior ==
No information exists about the social organization of the smoky shrew. Some field biologists, noting the abundance of the species in certain areas and its absence in others, have suggested the smoky shrew is colonial. However, their data remain inconclusive, and may reflect a tendency for smoky shrews to achieve dense populations within pockets of suitable habitats instead of exhibiting a complex social structure.

Smoky shrews are quite vocal although the form and function of the vocal repertoire are not well known. Individuals "twitter" while foraging, and give high-pitched grating noises when alarmed.
