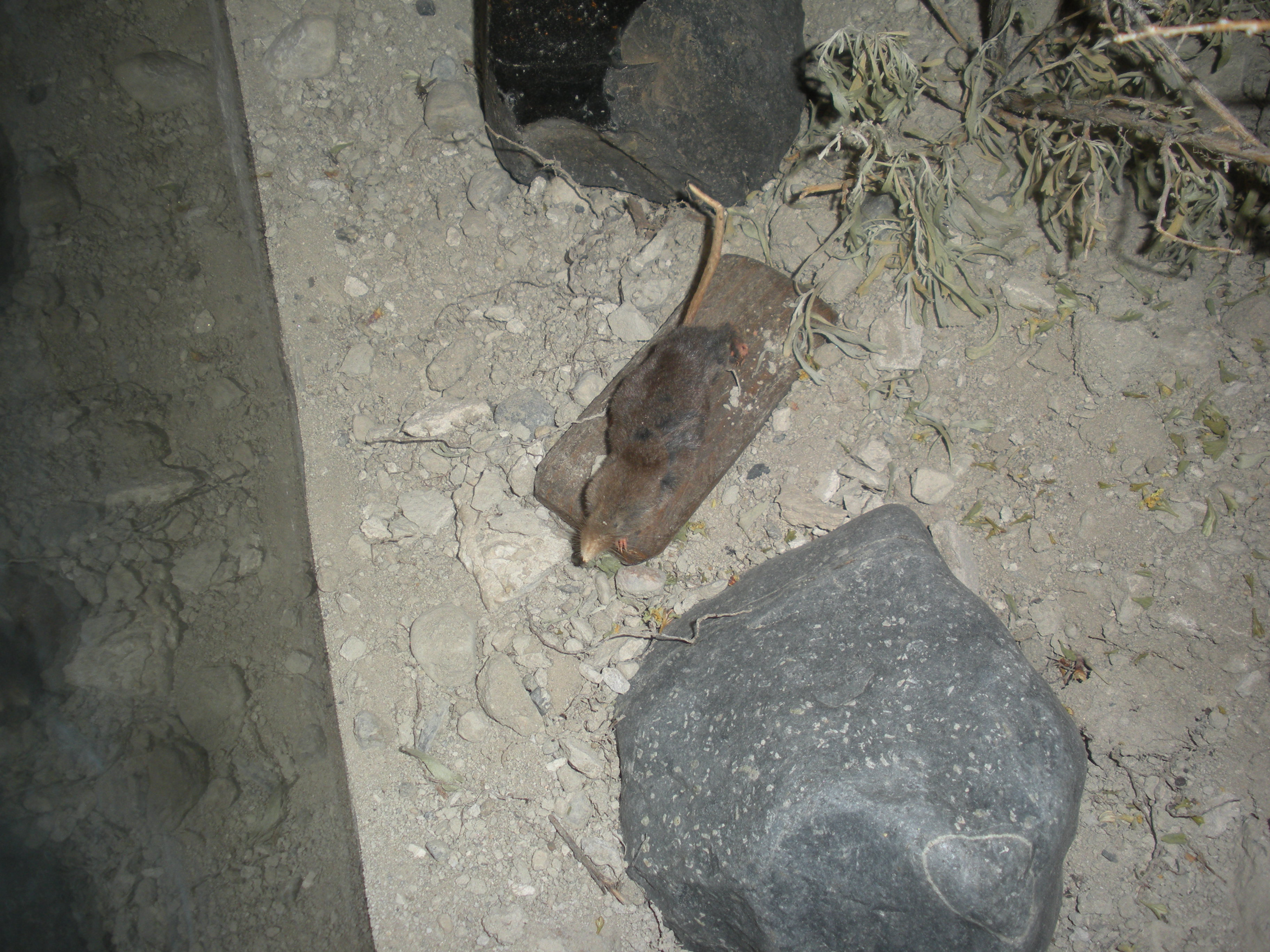
- A taxidermied Merriam's shrew at a visitor center

Conservation status
- Least Concern (IUCN 3.1)

Scientific classification
- Kingdom: Animalia
- Phylum: Chordata
- Class: Mammalia
- Order: Eulipotyphla
- Family: Soricidae
- Genus: Sorex
- Species: S. merriami

Binomial name
- Sorex merriami Dobson, 1890
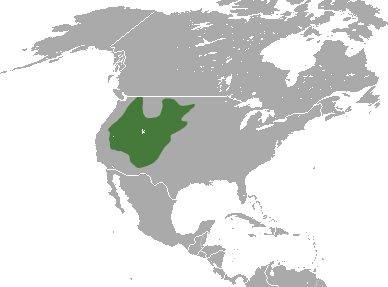
- Merriam's shrew range

= Merriam's shrew =

Species of mammal

Merriam's shrew (Sorex merriami) is a species of mammal in the family Soricidae. It is endemic to the western United States and extreme southern British Columbia in Canada.
