= Dwarf shrew =

Conservation status
- Least Concern (IUCN 3.1)

Scientific classification
- Kingdom: Animalia
- Phylum: Chordata
- Class: Mammalia
- Order: Eulipotyphla
- Family: Soricidae
- Genus: Sorex
- Species: S. nanus

Binomial name
- Sorex nanus Merriam, 1895
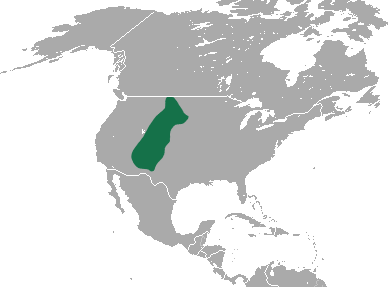
- Dwarf shrew range

Species of mammal

The dwarf shrew (Sorex nanus) is a species of mammal in the family Soricidae endemic to Arizona, Colorado, Montana, Nebraska, New Mexico, South Dakota, Utah, and Wyoming in the United States. The type locality is Estes Park (Larimer County), Colorado, USA.

== Description ==
As described by its common name, the dwarf shrew is a very small species of shrew, usually weighing 1.8 to 3.2 g. It changes its pelage (fur) based on the season to aid in hiding from predators. In summer, the pelage is brown to olive brown on the dorsal side. This color extends down the side and merges with the smoke gray fur on its stomach. The tail is bicolored, a mixture of dark fur on top and beige fur underneath. During the winter, its pelage turns lighter and grayer, especially on its back, again to blend into the surroundings.

== Phylogeny ==
The phylogeny of the dwarf shrew is very controversial. Given the sheer number of species in the genus Sorex, they are difficult to tell apart. A phylogeny is proposed, and widely accepted now, in which S. vagrans gave rise to S. nanus along with S. longirostris and S. ornatus. This same theory provides evidence that S. nanus and S. tenellus diverged more recently than their relatives because they are morphologically indistinguishable from each other except for very small size differences.

== Distribution and habitat ==
The dwarf shrew lives primarily in mountain habitats, although it descends as low as 1400 to 1500 m in mountain ranges, the foothills of the Great Basin ranges and the Rocky Mountains. The ecological distribution of dwarf shrews is not fully known. They have mostly been reported from rocky habitats in the alpine tundra and subalpine coniferous forests. The dwarf shrew does not seem to be more tolerant of dry situations than its other shrew relatives. Dwarf shrews are also found in dry brushy slopes in Colorado around 1,670 m, in sagebrush-grassland in Montana at 1,036-1,128 m, and even at 750 m in Black Hills, South Dakota. This further adds to the mystery of their distribution. Dwarf shrew fossils have been found in late Pleistocene deposits in Hermit's Cave, New Mexico, and Moonshiner and Middle Butte caves in Idaho.

In the past, mammalogists considered the dwarf shrew to be a rare species. From 1895 to 1966, only 18 sightings of the dwarf shrew were reported, but a study on a frog in 1966 led to the capture of 24 dwarf shrews using pitfall traps. Another reason that they were thought to be a rare species is that they have a very fragmented distribution throughout southwestern North America, and they are easily confused with their closely related shrew family.
