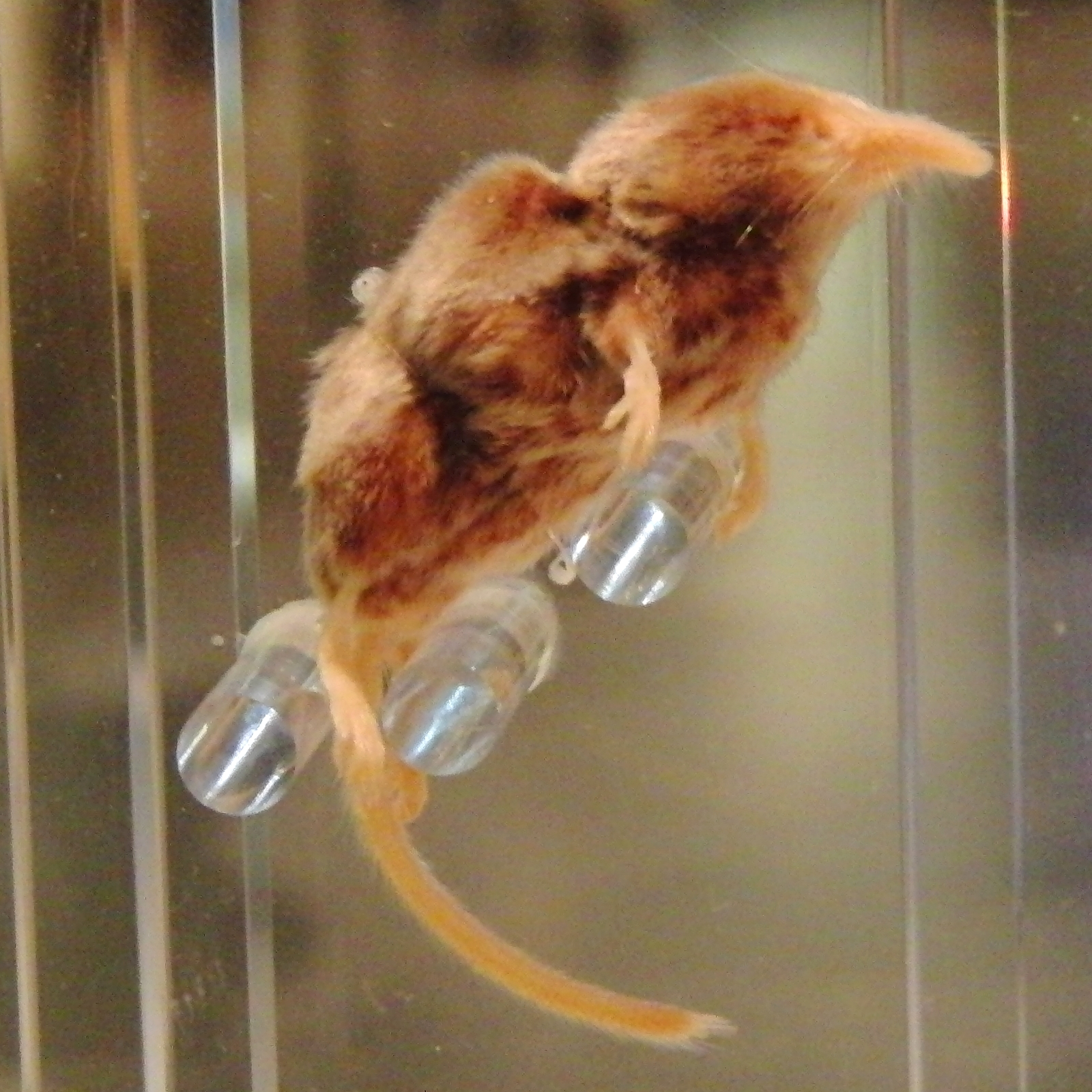
- Specimen exhibited in the National Museum of Nature and Science, Tokyo, Japan.

Conservation status
- Least Concern (IUCN 3.1)

Scientific classification
- Kingdom: Animalia
- Phylum: Chordata
- Class: Mammalia
- Order: Eulipotyphla
- Family: Soricidae
- Genus: Sorex
- Species: S. minutissimus

Binomial name
- Sorex minutissimus Zimmermann, 1780
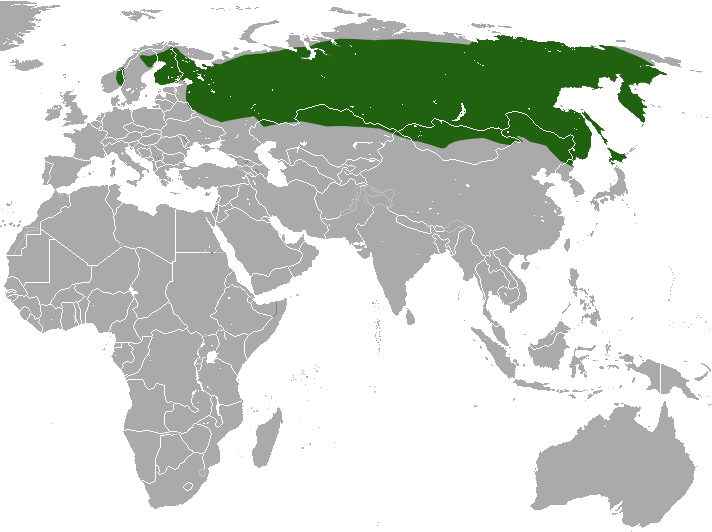
- Eurasian least shrew range

= Eurasian least shrew =

Species of mammal

The Eurasian least shrew (Sorex minutissimus), also called the lesser pygmy shrew, is the second-smallest mammal by mass after the Etruscan shrew.

== Appearance ==
The Eurasian least shrew weighs only 1.2–4 g (0.042–0.141 oz) and has a body less than 4 cm (1.6 in) long, with a 2.5 cm (0.98 in) tail. It has a brown back and a light grey underside, with a fairly clear boundary in between. The color of the back varies seasonally from chocolate brown in summer to light brown in winter. The same bicolor pattern extends to the tail, which has a dark brown tuft of hair at the end. The feet are the same color as the belly, with brown heels.

== Distribution ==
The Eurasian least shrew inhabits the northern taiga region, and is found throughout Siberia, in northern Europe (Finland, northern Sweden and parts of Norway) and on the islands of Sakhalin and Hokkaidō. It can be found in diverse habitats, including both coniferous and deciduous forests, open fields, and the edges of bogs. The population density appears to be fairly low throughout, though its prevalence may be underestimated in surveys since its small size lets it escape many commonly used traps.

== Behavior ==
Due to its small size and reclusive habits, the Eurasian least shrew can be difficult to spot. Like shrews in general, the Eurasian least shrew mainly eats insects, but will also dine on carrion or any other source of protein it finds. In winter, it may occasionally seek food indoors. Because of its small size for a mammal, the Eurasian least shrew has an extremely high metabolic rate and must eat frequently to avoid starvation; in captivity it has been reported to eat 120 meals a day, consuming three to four times its own weight each day. The Eurasian least shrew is active around the clock, with occasional sleep periods of 10–50 minutes each.

The Eurasian least shrew can swim well, and in captivity even seems to enjoy playing in water. Its small size also makes the Eurasian least shrew a phenomenal climber: it has been observed climbing up even the smooth inside corner of a glass terrarium. Its eyesight is poor, but it has very good hearing. While the Eurasian least shrew frequently emits sounds, much of its communication is in frequencies beyond the limits of human hearing.

== Breeding ==
The female Eurasian least shrew has one or two litters a year, each typically consisting of 3–6 offspring. Little is known about the typical lifetime of the Eurasian least shrew in the wild, but in captivity some have managed to reach an age of over 2.5 years.

== Identification ==
The Eurasian least shrew may be mistaken for the slightly larger Eurasian pygmy shrew (S. minutus), which is commonly found in the same areas. Besides the size difference, the two species may be distinguished by the tail and feet of the least shrew being noticeably shorter in proportion to its body.
