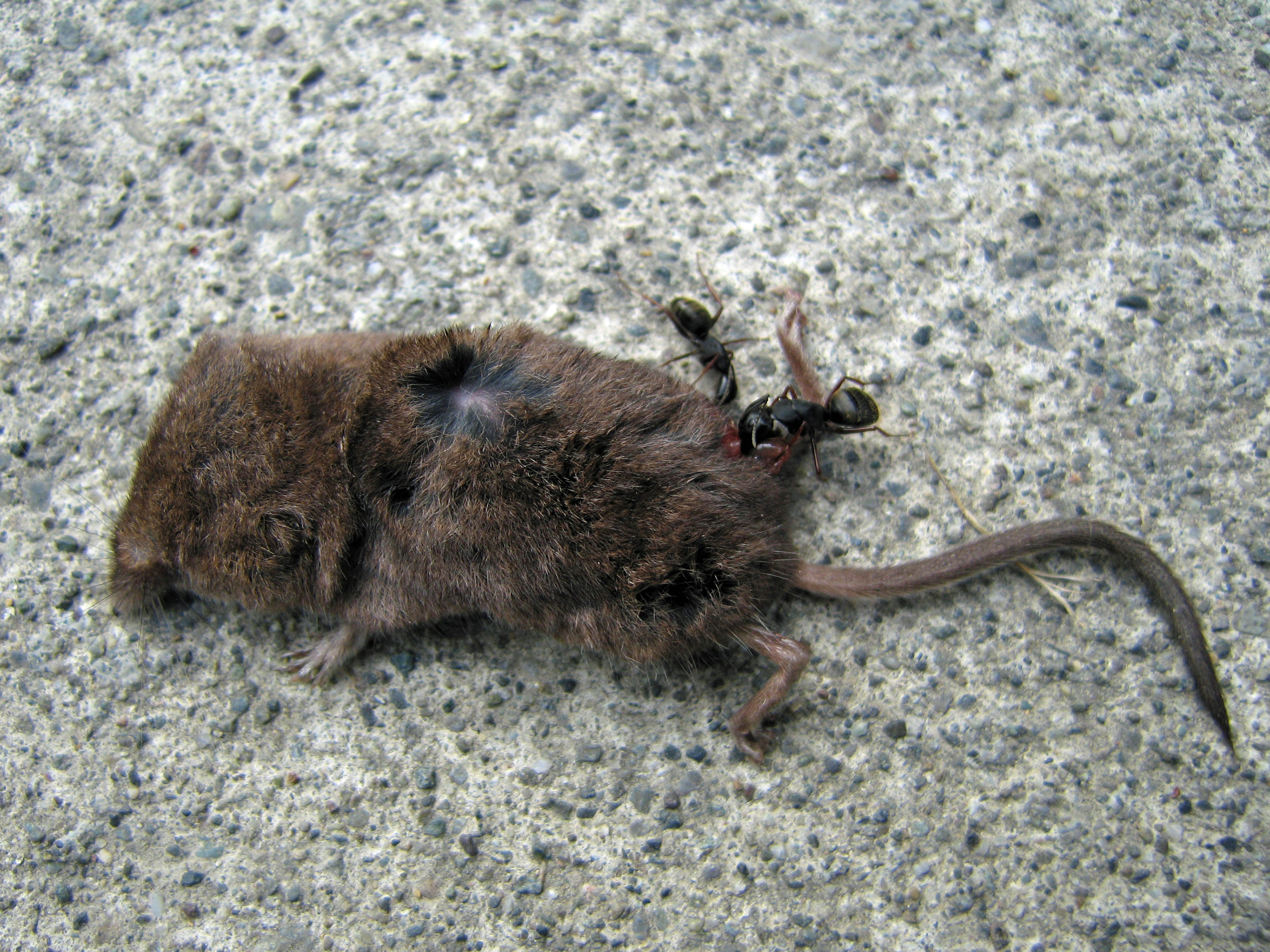

Conservation status
- Least Concern (IUCN 3.1)

Scientific classification
- Kingdom: Animalia
- Phylum: Chordata
- Class: Mammalia
- Order: Eulipotyphla
- Family: Soricidae
- Genus: Sorex
- Species: S. monticolus

Binomial name
- Sorex monticolus Merriam, 1890
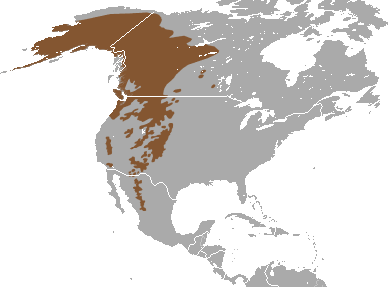
- Montane shrew range

= Montane shrew =

Species of mammal

The montane shrew (Sorex monticolus) is a species of mammal in the family Soricidae commonly known as the dusky shrew. Monticolus is derived from the Latin root word mons meaning mountain. It is found in Alaska, western Canada, the western United States in Washington, Idaho, Montana, Utah, Colorado, New Mexico, Arizona, Oregon, Nevada, and California, as well as in Mexico.

== Habitat ==
Montane shrews occupy vast niches of moist grassy areas such as meadows and river banks. They are also found in coniferous forests, including taiga and high mountain subalpine and montane forests, with a large amount of ground litter used for coverage with acidic soils, as well as boreal and temperate rain forests.

== Morphology ==
The upper incisors of Sorex monticolus are commonly larger, more robust, and harder than that of its sister taxa group as well having a larger cranial size from the nose to the base of the skull ranging from 16.1 to 17.7 mm (0.63 to 0.70 in) in length and a larger palate length. They have five or six paired frictional pads on their hind feet. Its pelage is commonly brown or grey, molted twice a year during September and October with males and females having different molting periods. The color and molting period also depends upon the elevation and location of their niche.

== Reproduction ==
During reproduction sweat and sebaceous glands enlarge in males to indicate male maturity and the odor of pheromones they produce is thought to attract available females. Males increase in size by 50% during and in preparation for reproduction events. After mating females may have up to three to four litters and remain in the breeding site and their territory after mating but males leave, indicating no parental care.

== Disease ==
Montane shrews live in habitats containing other species of shrews and competition for resources such as food and nesting material result in vicious fighting. Wounds procured from this may spread the disease hantavirus through shrew species that compete.
