= List of mammals of British Columbia =

This is a list of mammals of British Columbia.

== Bats (Chiroptera) ==
=== Vesper bats (Vespertilionidae) ===
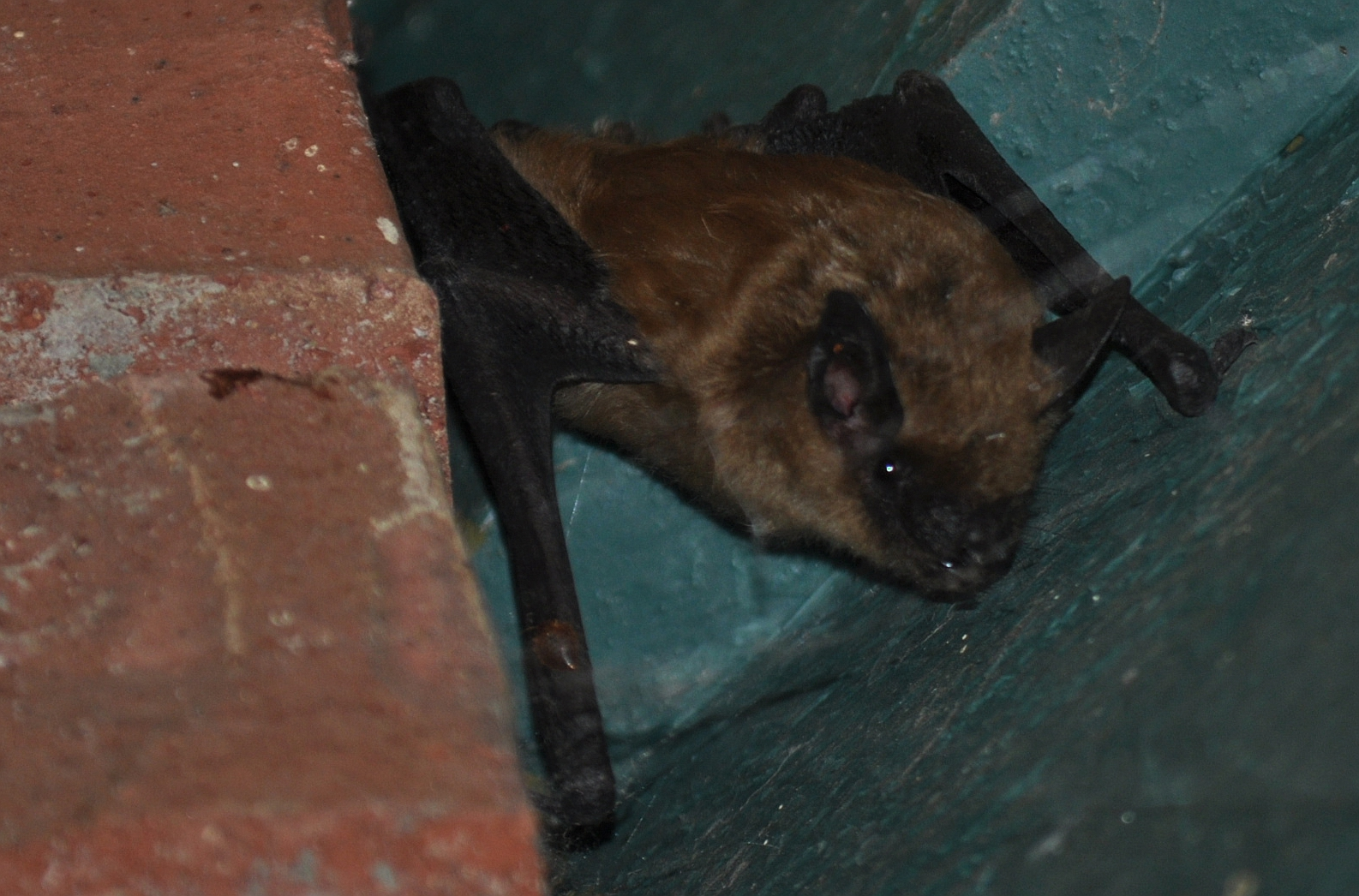
California myotis (Myotis californicus)

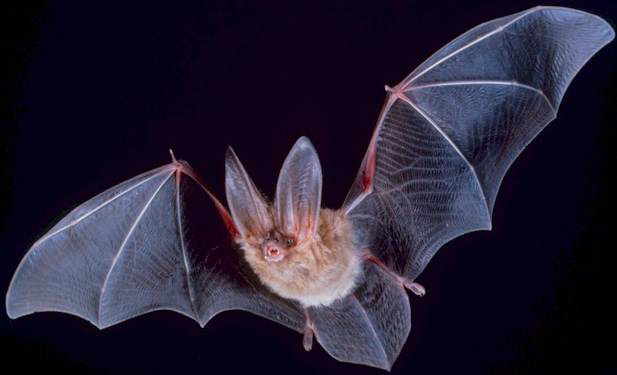
Townsend's big-eared bat (Corynorhinus townsendii)

- Fringed myotis (Myotis thysanodes) LC
- Long-eared myotis (Myotis evotis) LC
- Northern long-eared myotis (Myotis septentrionalis) NT
- California myotis (Myotis californicus) LC
- Little brown bat (Myotis lucifugus) EN
- Western small-footed bat (Myotis ciliolabrum) LC
- Yuma myotis (Myotis yumanensis) LC
- Long-legged myotis (Myotis volans) LC
- Desert red bat (Lasiurus blossevillii) LC
- Hoary bat (Lasiurus cinereus) LC
- Silver-haired bat (Lasionycteris noctivagans) LC
- Big brown bat (Eptesicus fuscus) LC
- Spotted bat (Euderma maculatum) LC
- Pallid bat (Antrozous pallidus) LC
- Townsend's big-eared bat (Corynorhinus townsendii) LC

== Carnivores (Carnivora) ==
=== Bears (Ursidae) ===
- Black bear (Ursus americanus) LC
- Brown bear (Ursus arctos) LC
  - Grizzly bear (Ursus arctos horribilis)

=== Raccoons (Procyonidae) ===
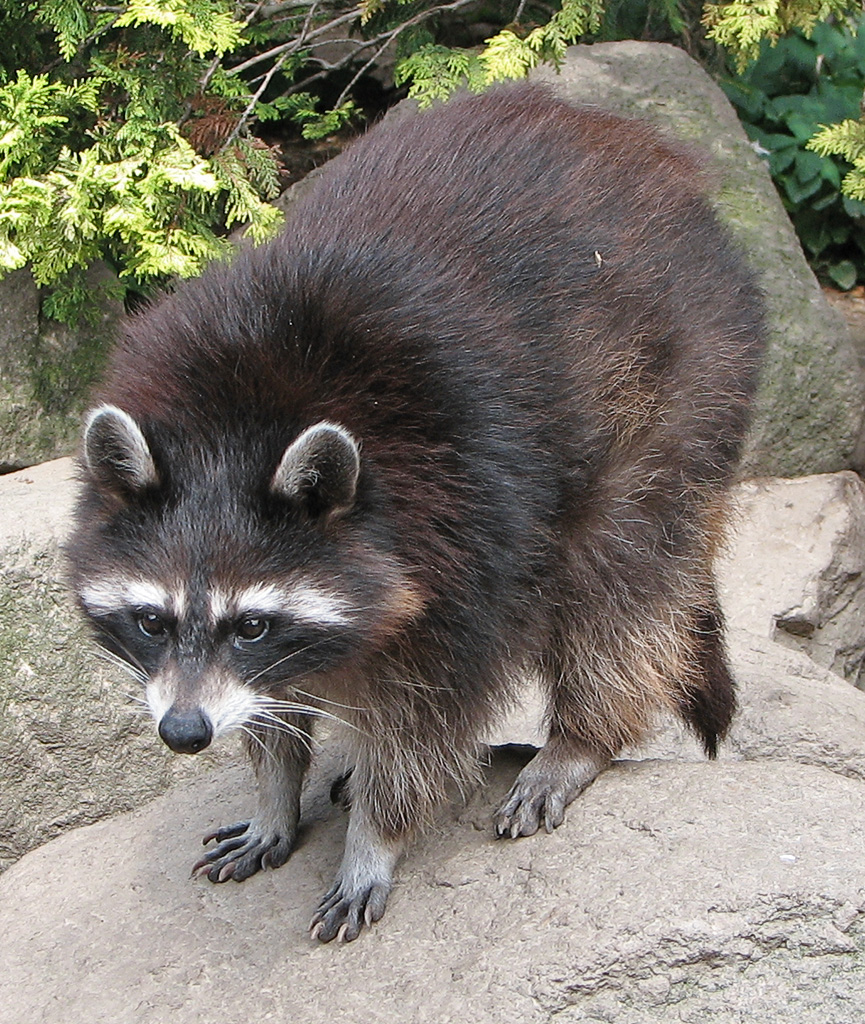
Raccoon (Procyon lotor)

- Common raccoon (Procyon lotor) LC

=== Skunks (Mephitidae) ===
- Western spotted skunk (Spilogale gracilis) LC
- Striped skunk (Mephitis mephitis) LC

=== Mustelids (Mustelidae) ===
- Sea otter (Enhydra lutris) EN
- Wolverine (Gulo gulo) LC
- North American river otter (Lontra canadensis) LC
- American marten (Martes americana) LC
- Pacific marten (Martes caurina) NE
- Haida ermine (Mustela haidarum) EN
- Least weasel (Mustela nivalis) LC
- American ermine (Mustela richardsonii) LC
- Long-tailed weasel (Neogale frenata) LC
- American mink (Neogale vison) LC
- Fisher (Pekania pennanti) LC
- American badger (Taxidea taxus) LC

=== Felids (Felidae) ===
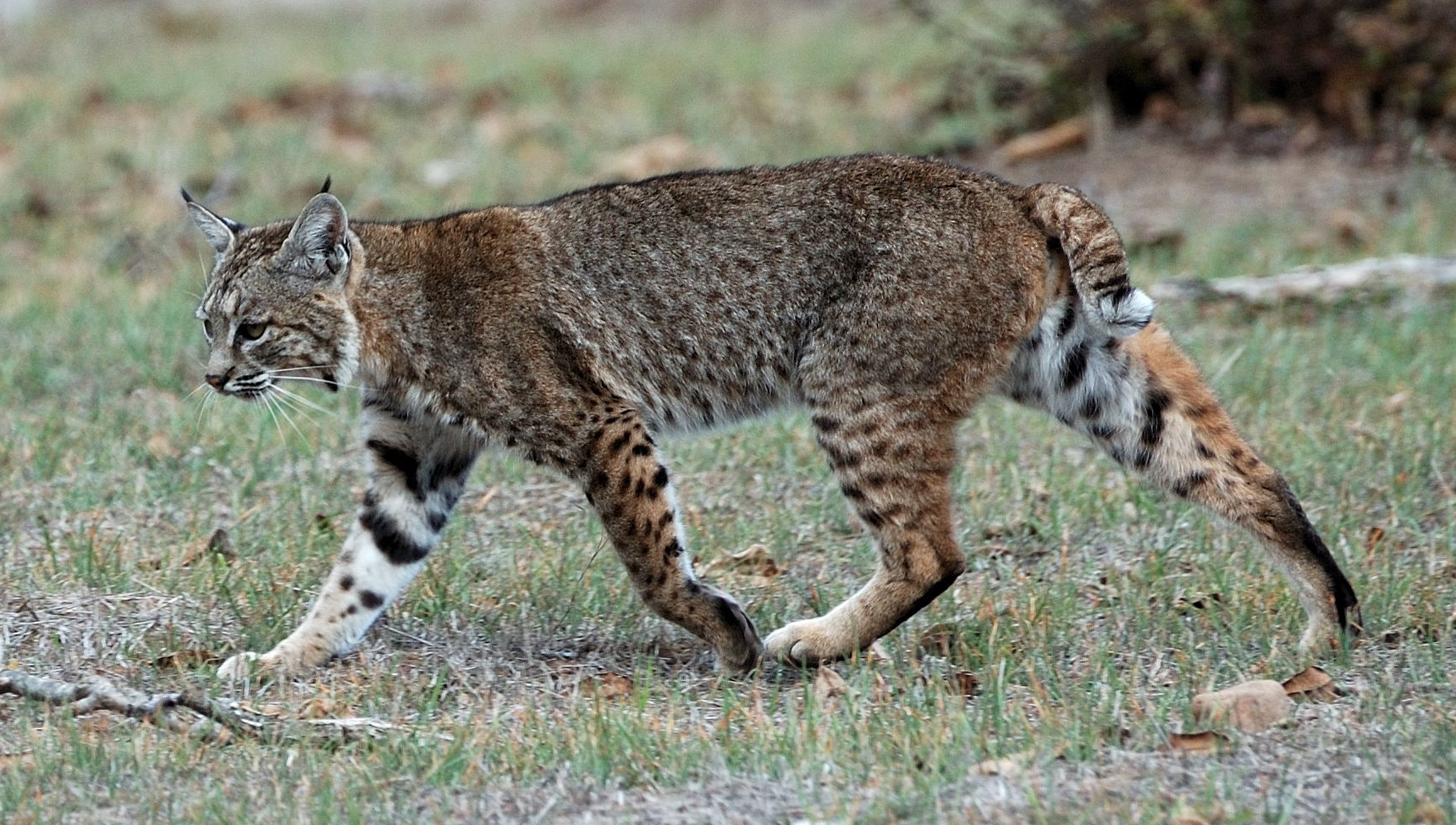
Bobcat

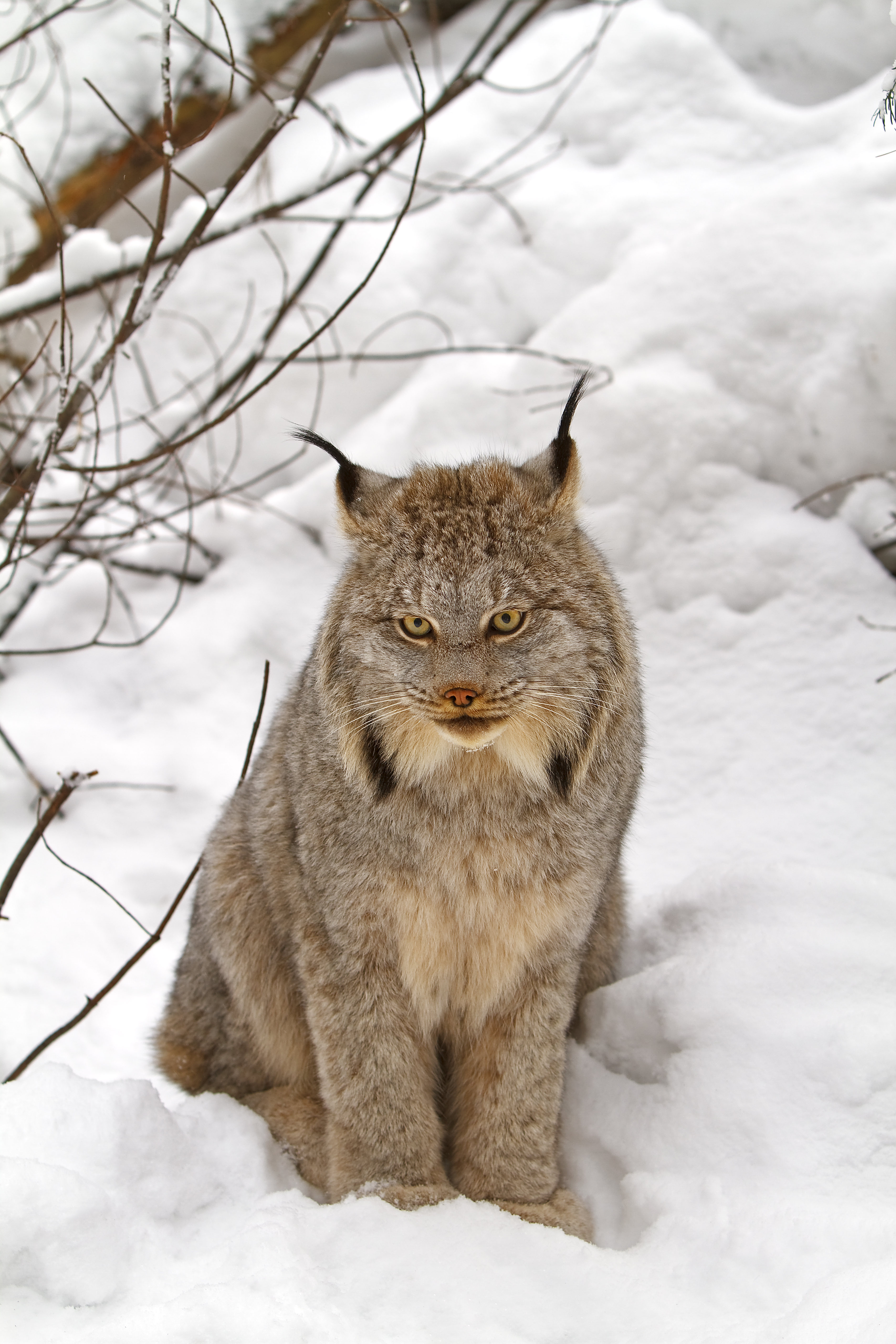
Canada lynx

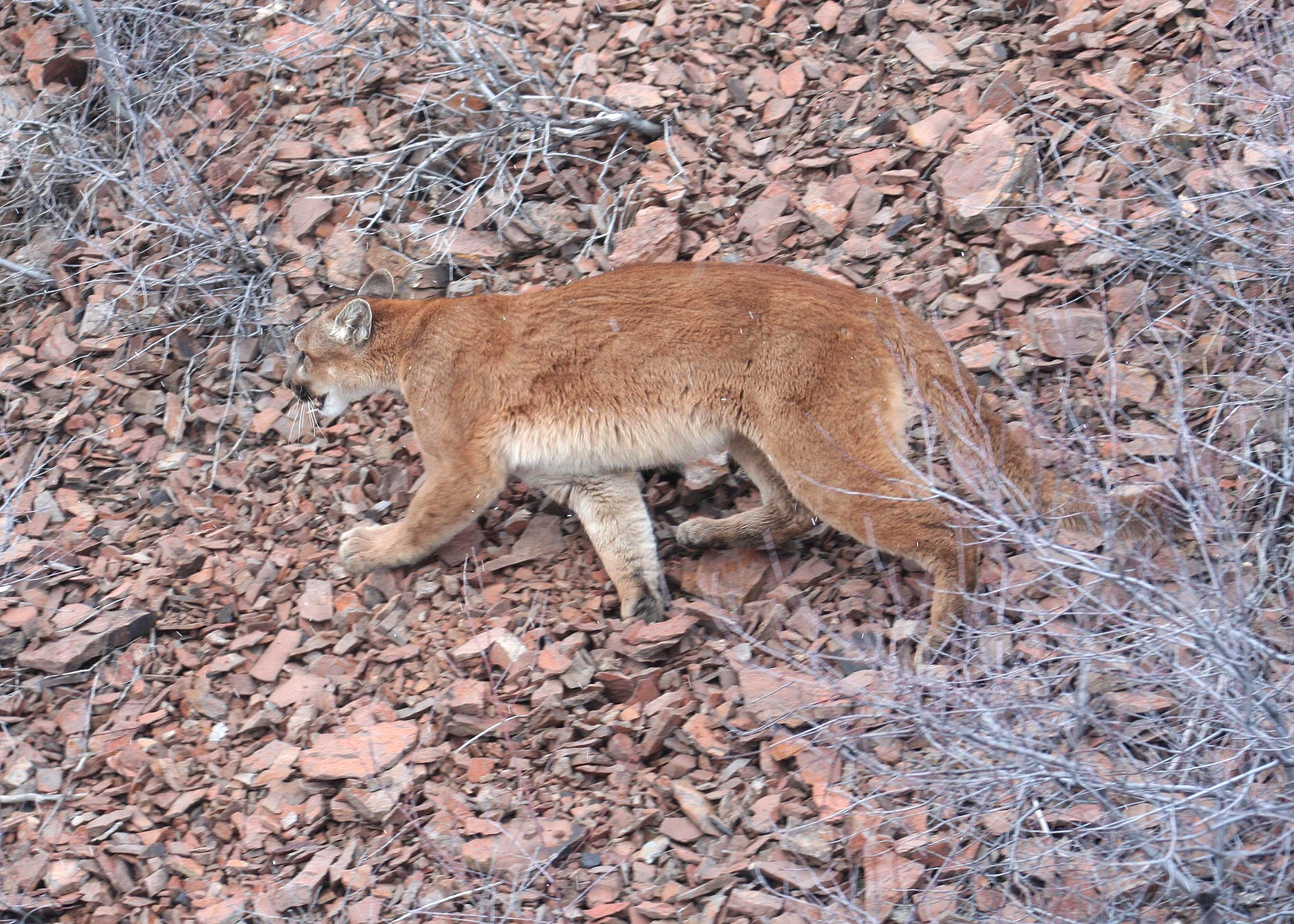
Cougar

- Bobcat (Lynx rufus) LC
- Canada lynx (Lynx canadensis) LC
- Cougar (Puma concolor) LC

=== Canids (Canidae) ===
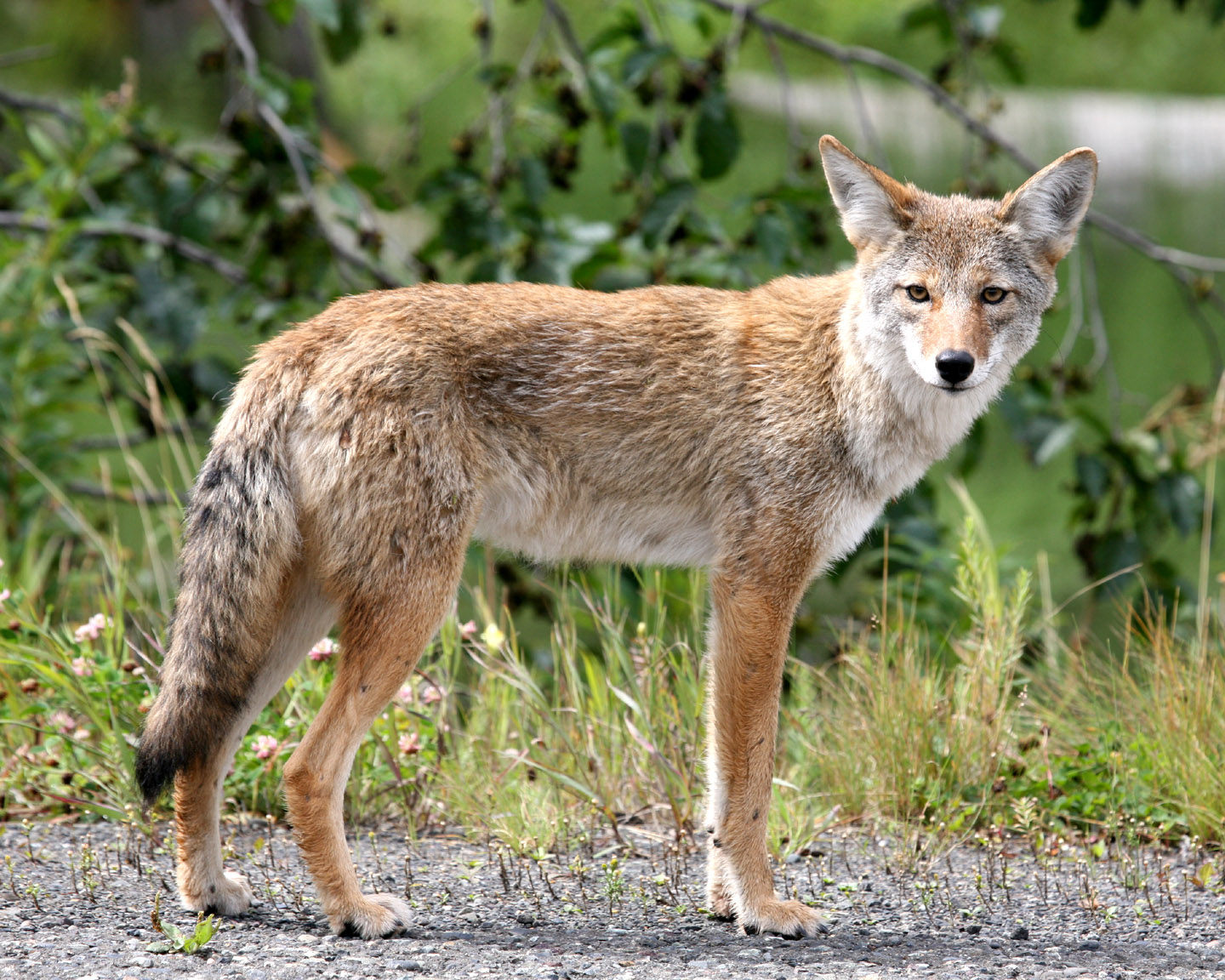
Coyote

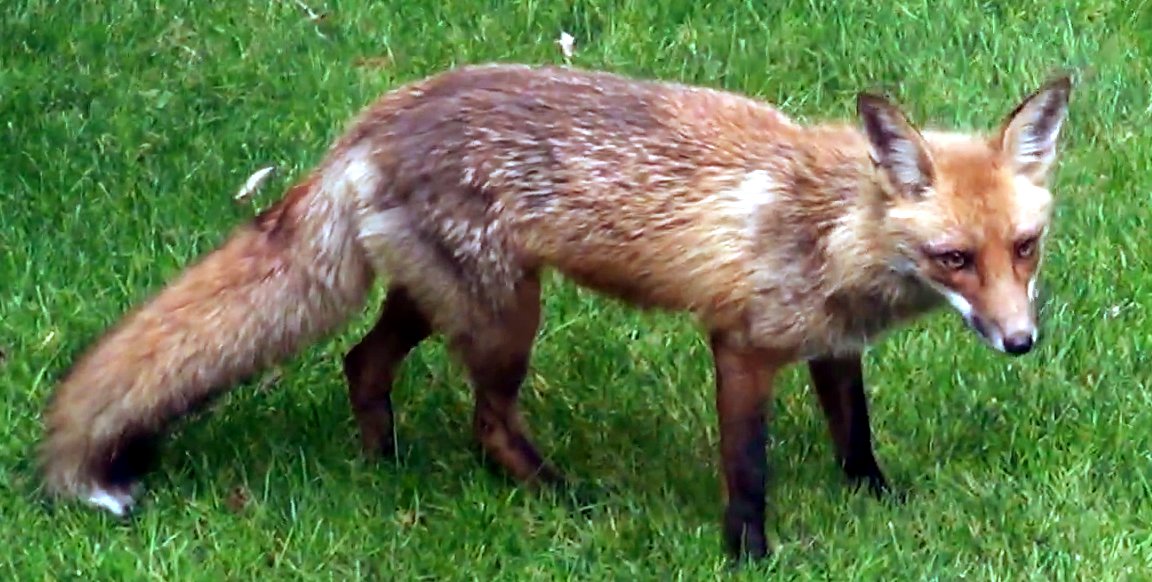
Red fox

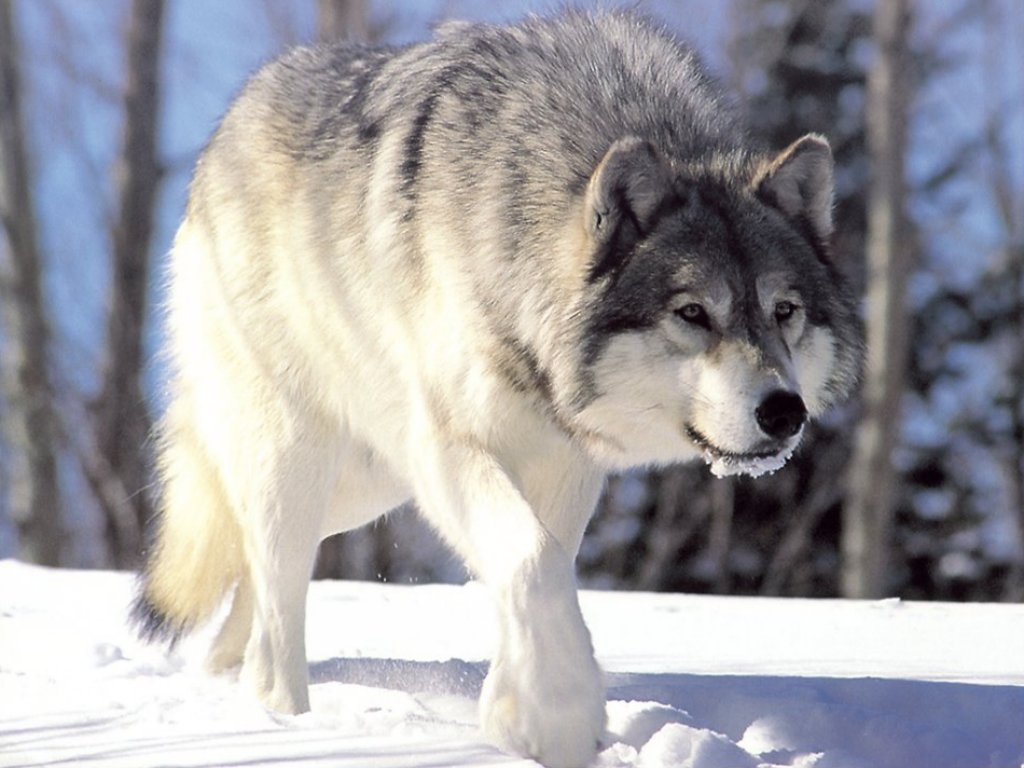
Timber wolf

- Coyote (Canis latrans) LC
- Grey wolf (Canis lupus) LC
- Red fox (Vulpes vulpes) LC

=== Earless seals (Phocidae) ===
- Harbor seal (Phoca vitulina) LC
- Northern elephant seal (Mirounga angustirostris) LC

=== Eared seals (Otariidae) ===
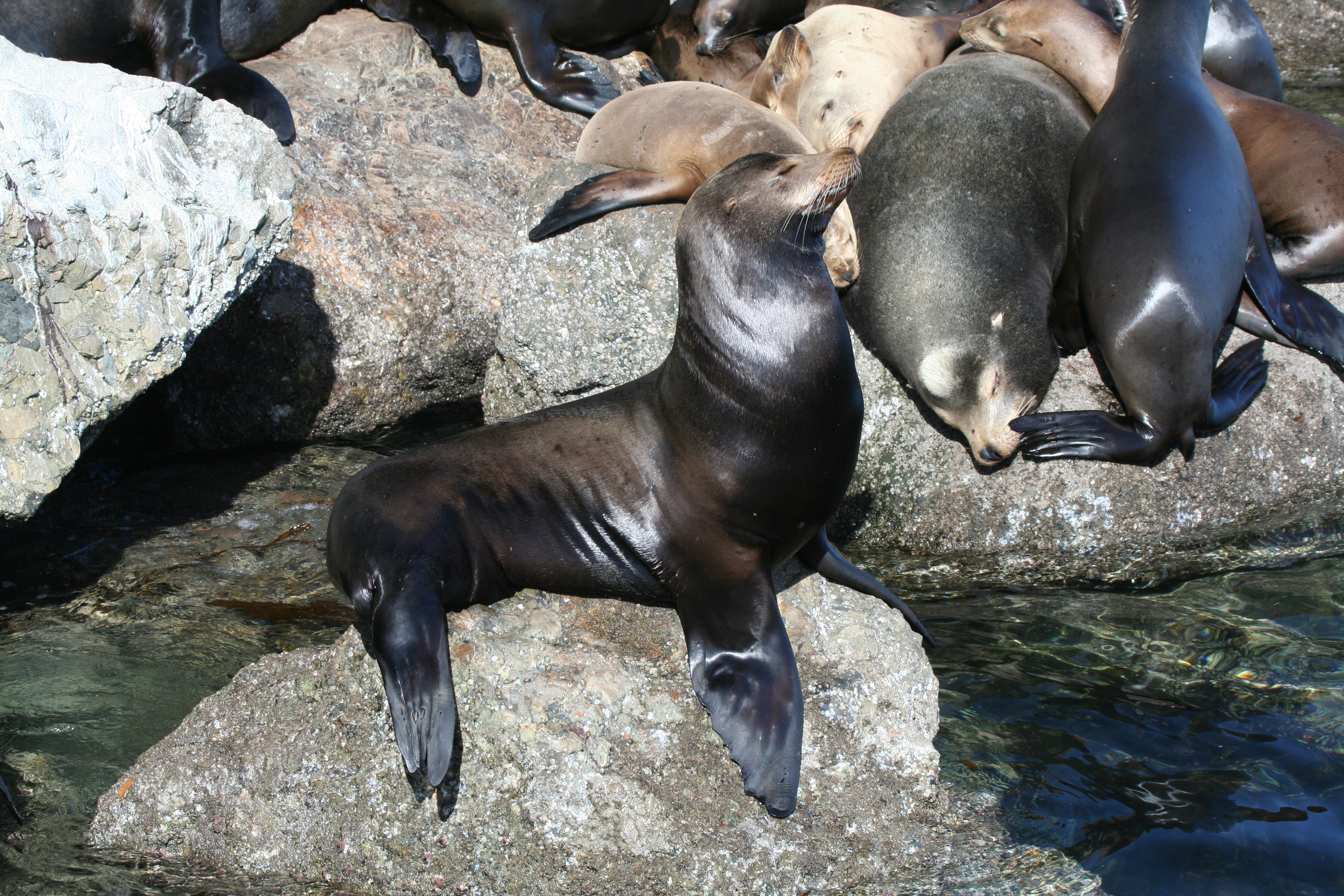
California sea lion (Zalophus californianus)

- Northern fur seal (Callorhinus ursinus) VU
- Steller sea lion (Eumetopias jubatus) NT
- California sea lion (Zalophus californianus) LC

== Even-toed ungulates (Artiodactyla) ==
=== Deer (Cervidae) ===
- Moose (Alces alces) LC
- Elk (Cervus canadensis) LC
- European fallow deer (Dama dama) introduced LC
- Mule deer (Odocoileus hemionus) LC
- White-tailed deer (Odocoileus virginianus) LC
- Caribou (Rangifer tarandus) VU

=== Bovids (Bovidae) ===
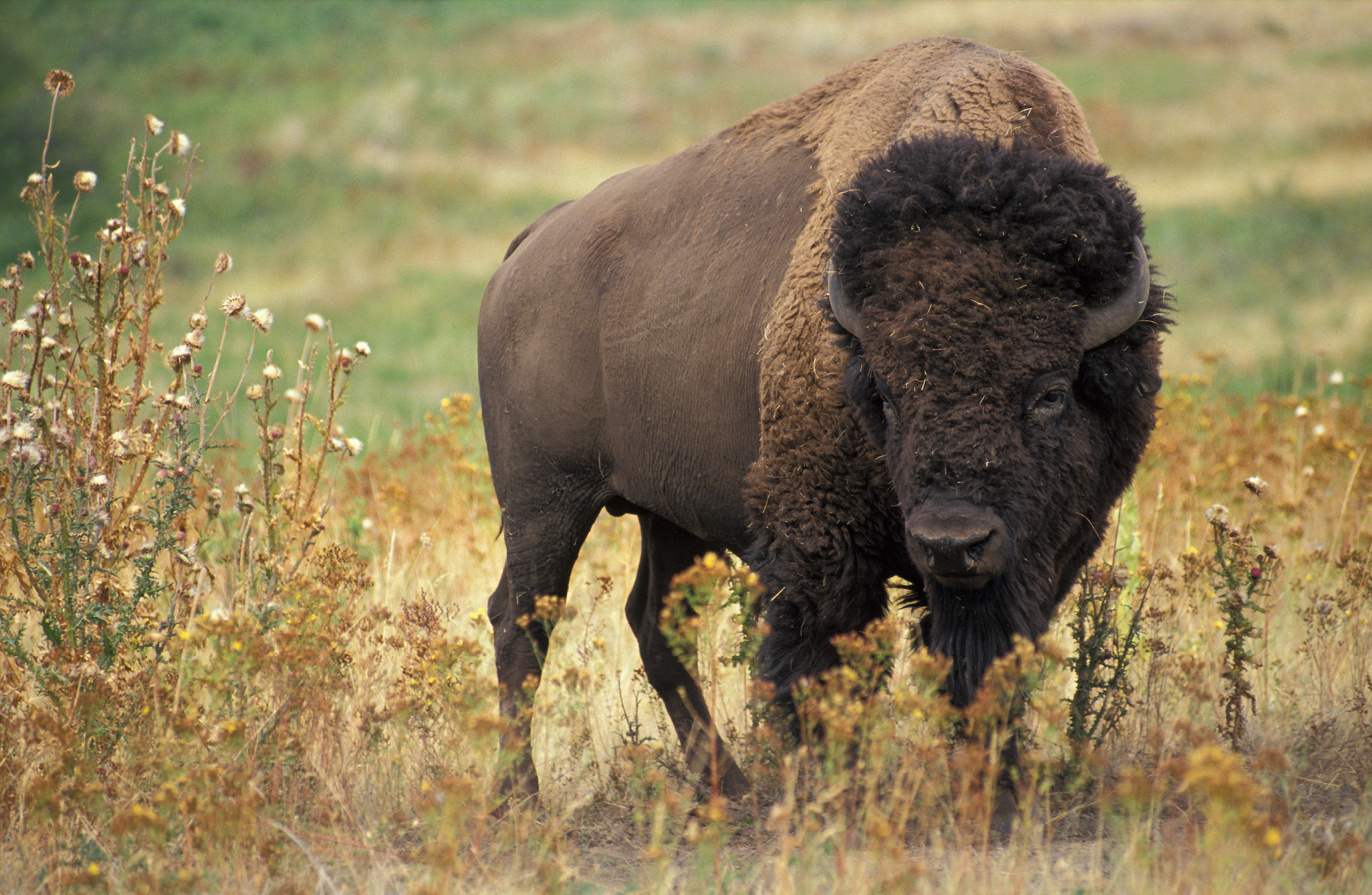
American bison (Bison bison)

- American bison (Bison bison) NT
- Mountain goat (Oreamnos americanus) LC
- Bighorn sheep (Ovis canadensis) LC
- Dall sheep (Ovis dalli) LC

== Rodents (Rodentia) ==
=== Beavers (Castoridae) ===
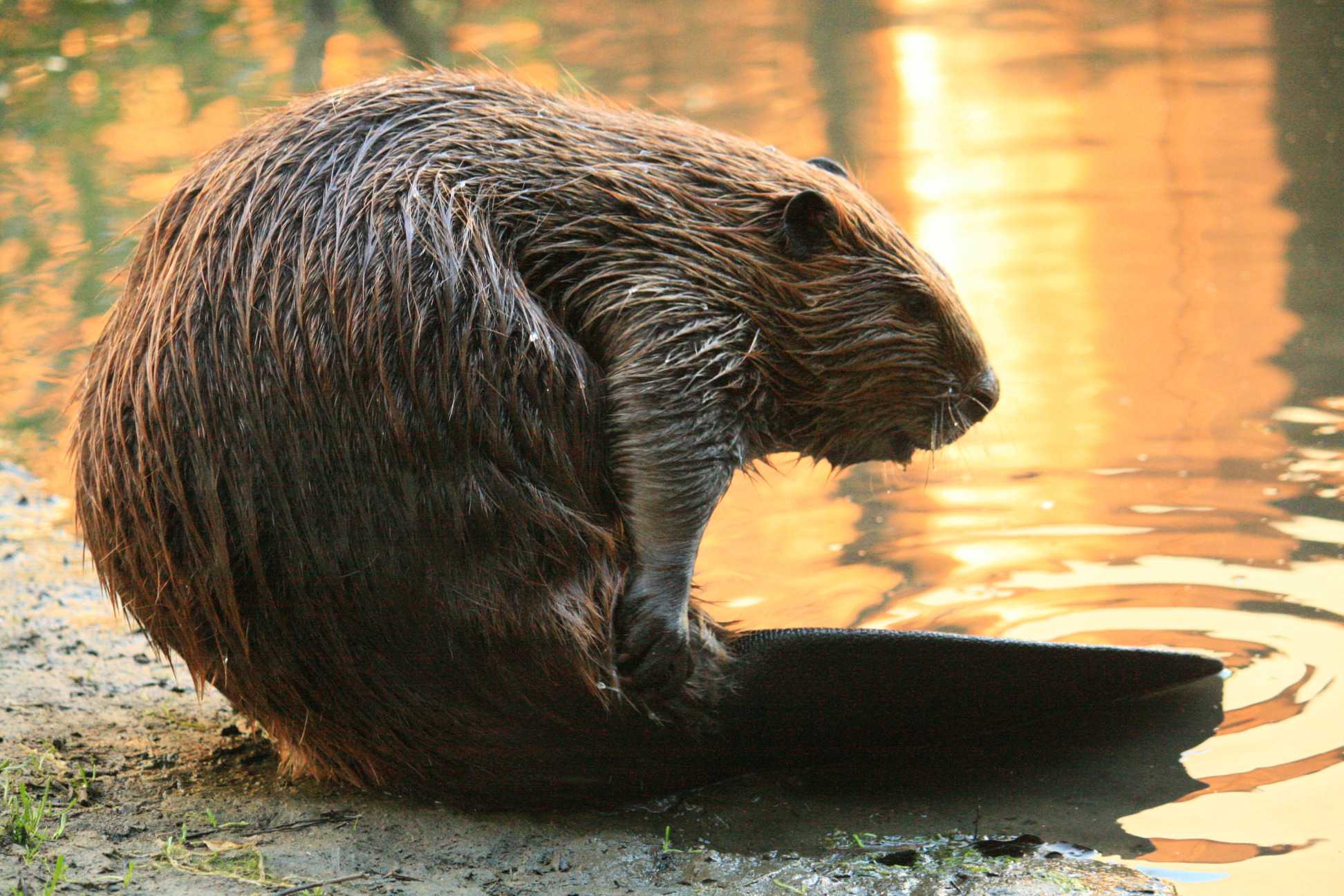
North American beaver (Castor canidensis)

- North American beaver (Castor canadensis) LC

=== New World porcupines (Erethizontidae) ===
- North American porcupine (Erethizon dorsatum) LC

=== Dipodids (Dipodidae) ===
- Meadow jumping mouse (Zapus hudsonius) LC
- Western jumping mouse (Zapus princeps) LC
- Pacific jumping mouse (Zapus trinotatus) LC

=== Cricetidae ===
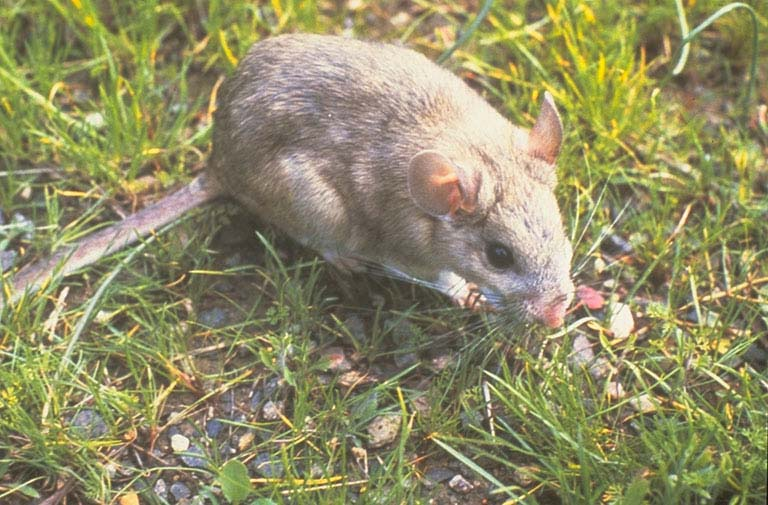
Bushy-tailed woodrat (Neotoma cinerea)

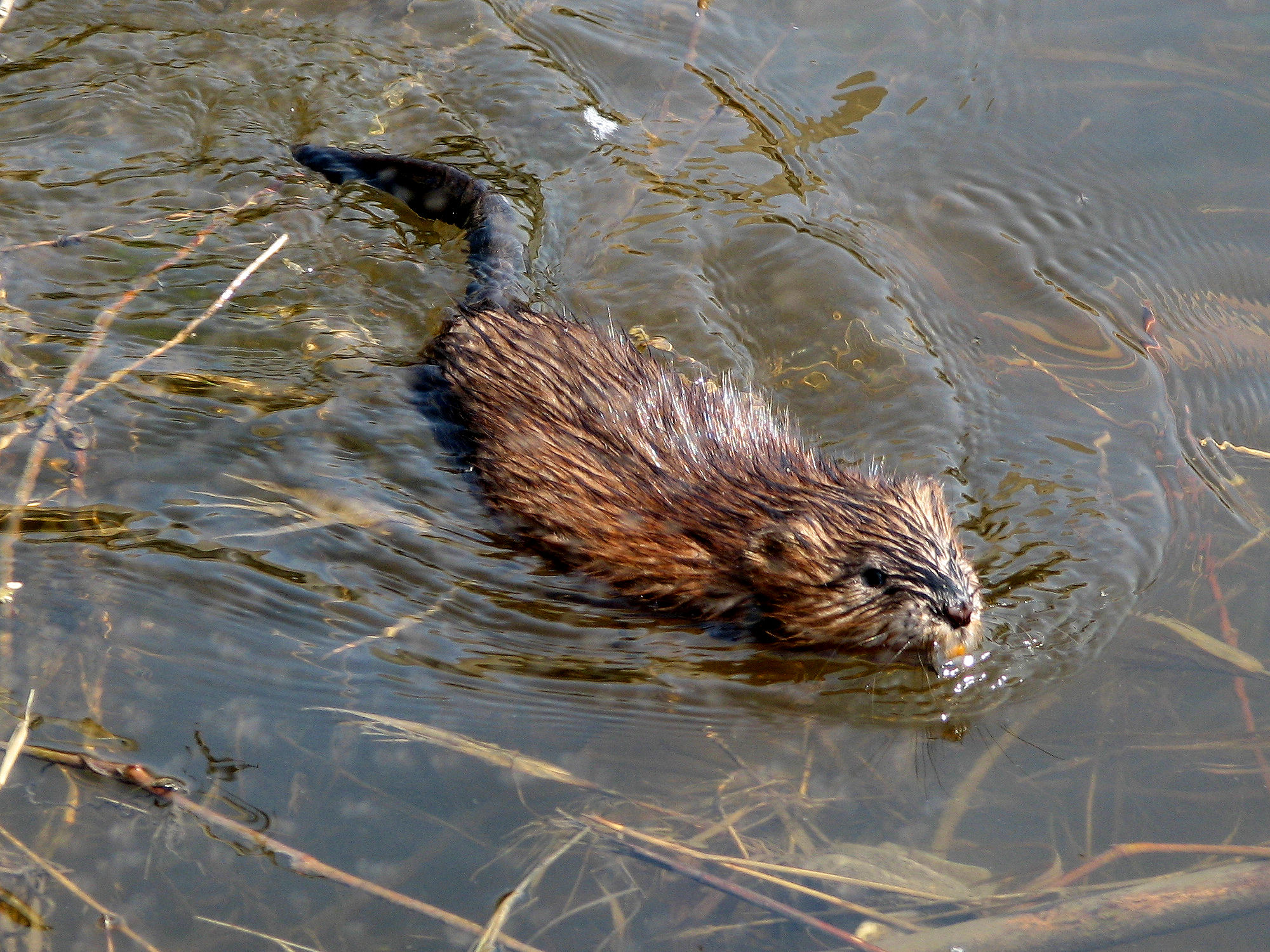
Muskrat (Ondatra zibethicus)

- Western harvest mouse (Reithrodontomys megalotis) LC
- Bushy-tailed woodrat (Neotoma cinerea) LC
- Northwestern deer mouse (Peromyscus keeni) LC
- Western deer mouse (Peromyscus sonoriensis) LC
- Southern red-backed vole (Myodes gapperi) LC
- Northern red-backed vole (Myodes rutilus) LC
- Western heather vole (Phenacomys intermedius) LC
- Eastern heather vole (Phenacomys ungava) LC
- Water vole (Microtus richardsoni) LC
- Meadow vole (Microtus pennsylvanicus) LC
- Montane vole (Microtus montanus) LC
- Townsend's vole (Microtus townsendii) LC
- Tundra vole (Microtus oeconomus) LC
- Long-tailed vole (Microtus longicaudus) LC
- Creeping vole (Microtus oregoni) LC
- Muskrat (Ondatra zibethicus) LC
- Siberian brown lemming (Lemmus sibiricus) LC
- Northern bog lemming (Synaptomys borealis) LC

=== Muridae ===
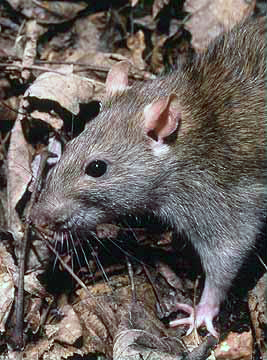
Brown rat (Rattus norvegicus)

- Black rat (Rattus rattus) LC
- Brown rat (Rattus norvegicus) LC
- House mouse (Mus musculus) LC

=== Heteromyidae ===
- Great Basin pocket mouse (Perognathus parvus) LC

=== Pocket gophers (Geomyidae) ===
- Northern pocket gopher (Thomomys talpoides) LC

=== Squirrels (Sciuridae) ===
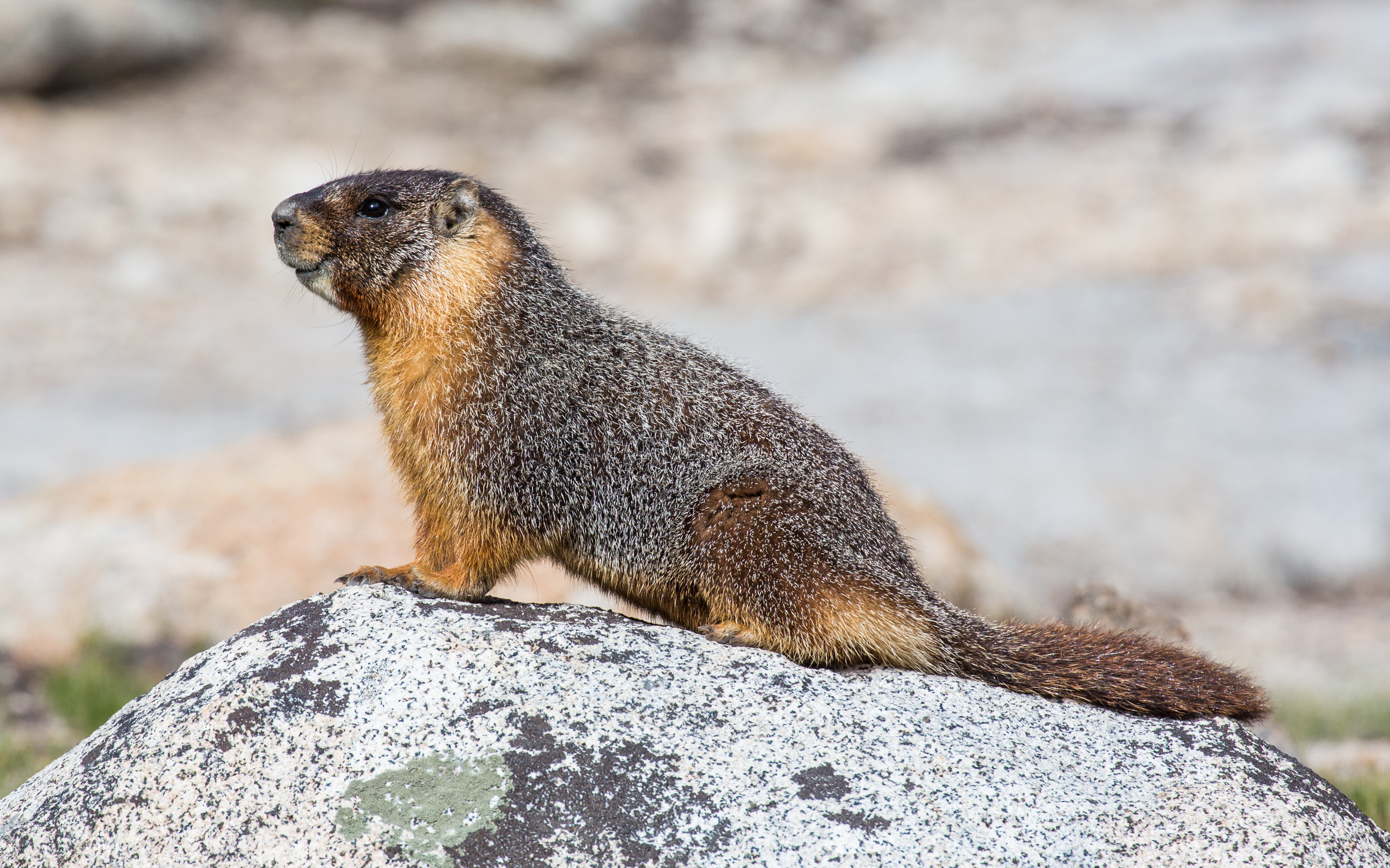
Yellow-bellied marmot (Marmota flaviventris)

- Yellow-pine chipmunk (Tamias amoenus) LC
- Least chipmunk (Tamias minimus) LC
- Red-tailed chipmunk (Tamias ruficaudus) LC
- Townsend's chipmunk (Tamias townsendii) LC
- Groundhog (Marmota monax) LC
- Yellow-bellied marmot (Marmota flaviventris) LC
- Hoary marmot (Marmota caligata) LC
- Vancouver Island marmot (Marmota vancouverensis) CR
- Columbian ground squirrel (Spermophilus columbianus) LC
- Arctic ground squirrel (Spermophilus parryii) LC
- Cascade golden-mantled ground squirrel (Spermophilus saturatus) LC
- Golden-mantled ground squirrel (Spermophilus lateralis) LC
- Eastern grey squirrel (Sciurus carolinensis) LC
- Fox squirrel (Sciurus niger) LC
- Douglas squirrel (Tamiasciurus douglasii) LC
- American red squirrel (Tamiasciurus hudsonicus) LC
- Northern flying squirrel (Glaucomys sabrinus) LC
- Humboldt's flying squirrel (Glaucomys oregonensis) LC

=== Aplodontiidae ===
- Mountain beaver (Aplodontia rufa) LC

== Lagomorpha ==
=== Leporidae ===
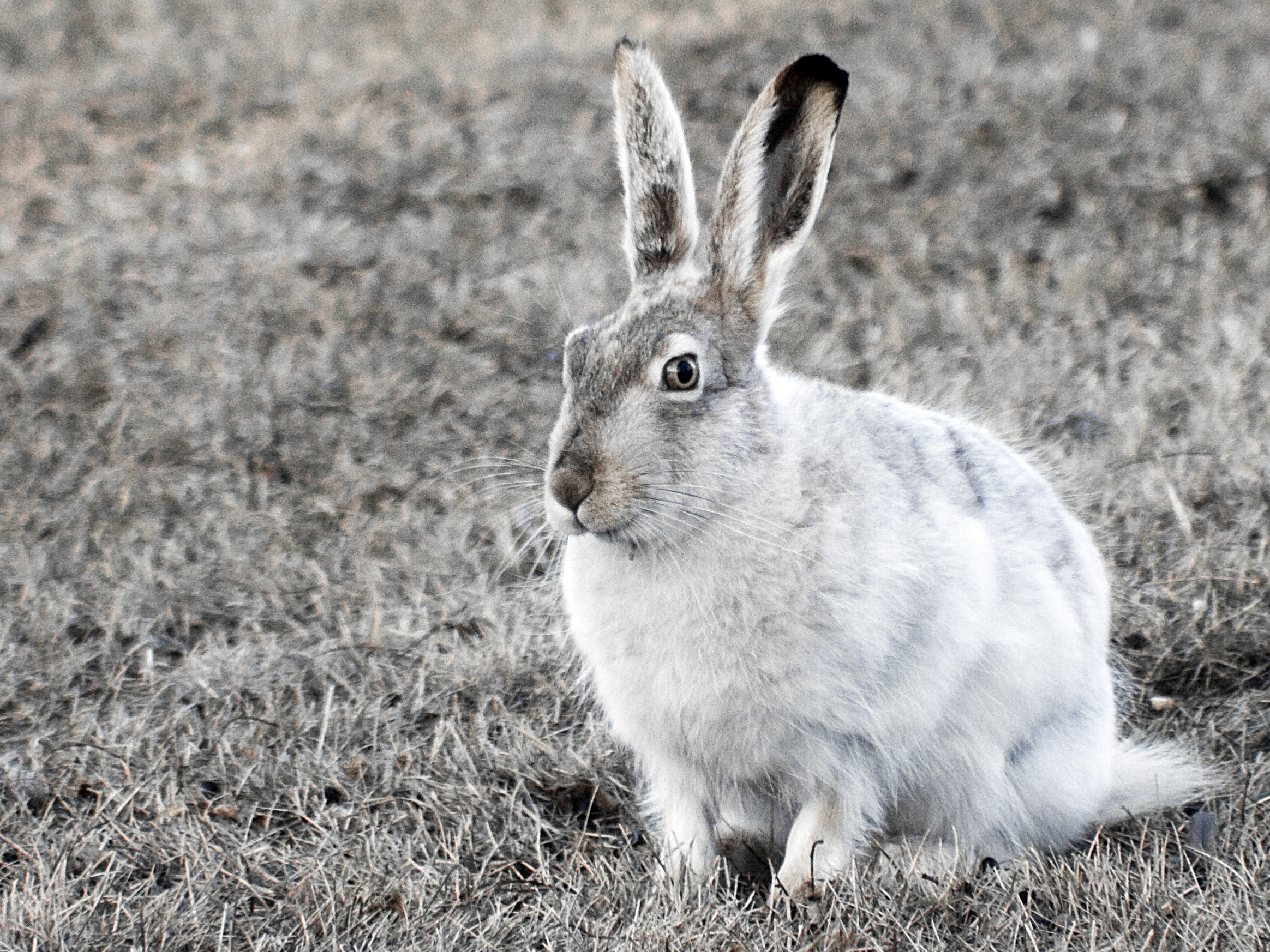
White-tailed jackrabbit (Lepus townsendii)

- Mountain cottontail (Sylvilagus nuttallii) LC
- European rabbit (Oryctolagus cuniculus) EN introduced
- Snowshoe hare (Lepus americanus) LC
- White-tailed jackrabbit (Lepus townsendii) LC

=== Pikas (Ochotonidae) ===
- Collared pika (Ochotona collaris) LC
- American pika (Ochotona princeps) LC

== Soricomorpha ==
=== Talpidae ===
- Townsend's mole (Scapanus townsendii) LC
- Coast mole (Scapanus orarius) LC

=== Shrews (Soricidae) ===
Marsh shrew (Sorex bendirii)

- Cinereus shrew (Sorex cinereus) LC
- Preble's shrew (Sorex preblei) LC
- Vagrant shrew (Sorex vagrans) LC
- Western water shrew (Sorex navigator) LC
- American water shrew (Sorex palustris) LC
- Pacific water shrew (Sorex bendirii) LC
- Arctic shrew (Sorex arcticus) LC
- American pygmy shrew (Sorex hoyi) LC
- Tundra shrew (Sorex tundrensis) LC
- Trowbridge's shrew (Sorex trowbridgii) LC
- Merriam's shrew (Sorex merriami) LC
- Dusky shrew (Sorex monticolus; formerly Sorex obscurus) LC
- Olympic shrew (Sorex rohweri) LC

== Whales (Cetacea) ==
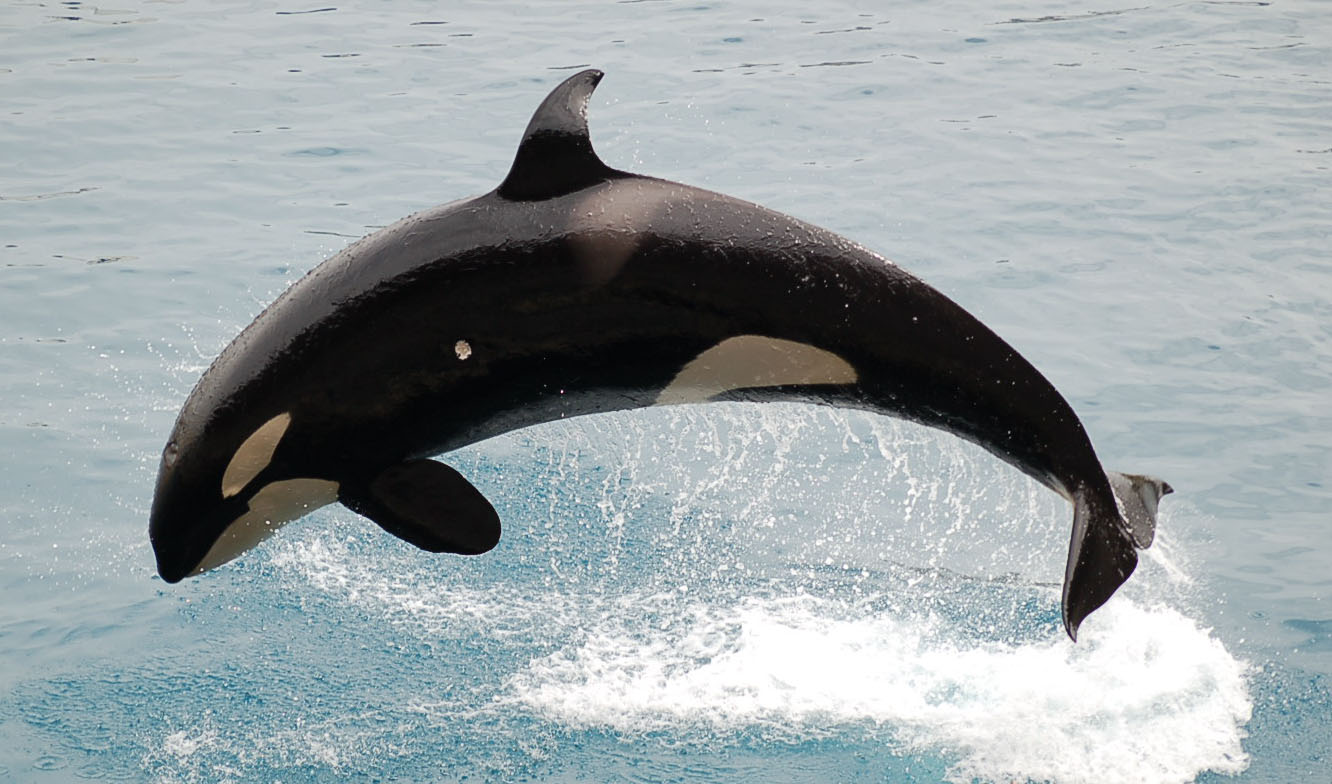
Orca (Orcinus orca)

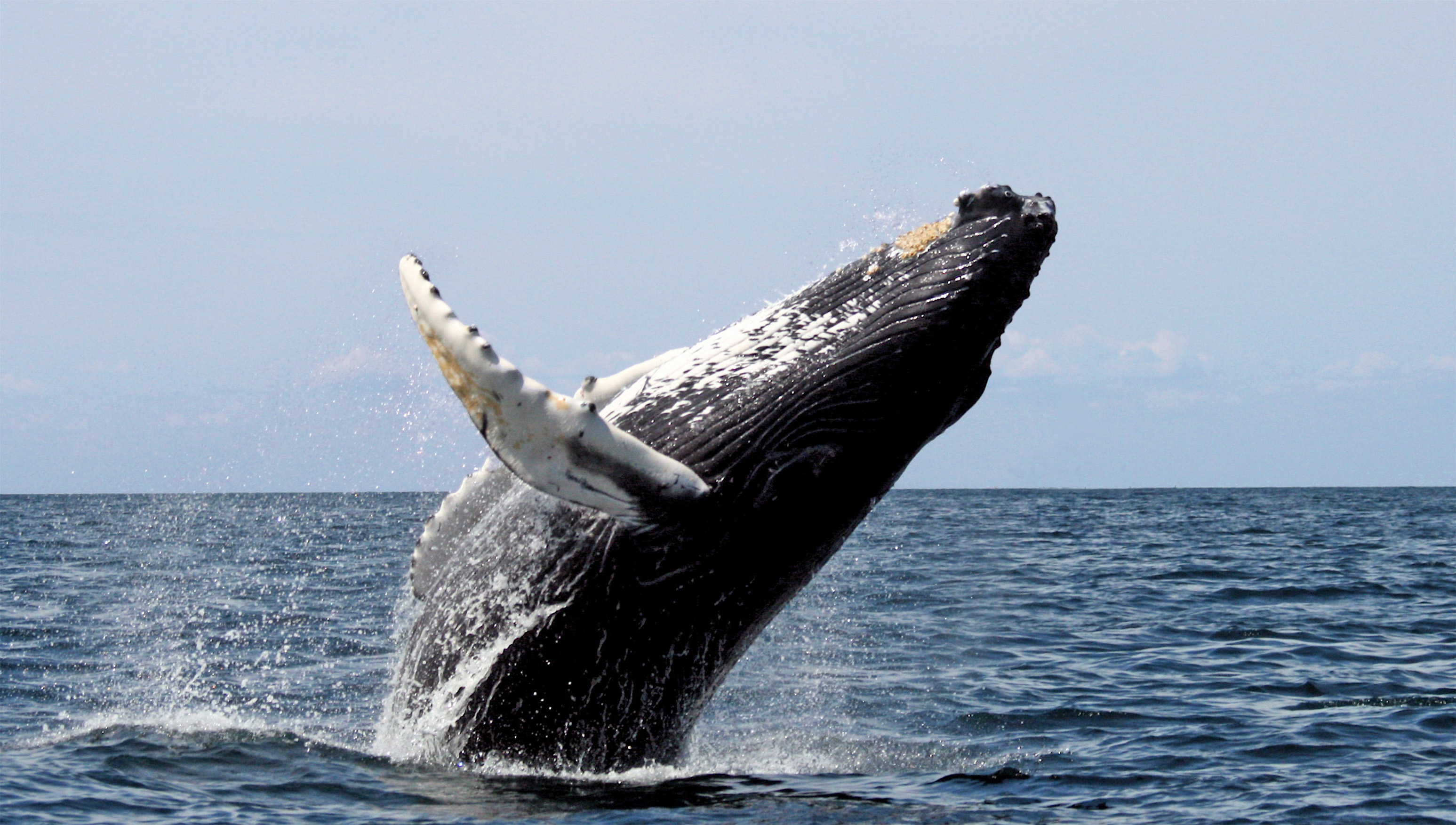
Humpback whale (Megaptera novaeangliae)

=== Oceanic dolphins (Delphinidae) ===
- Short-beaked common dolphin (Delphinus delphis) LC
- Short-finned pilot whale (Globicephala macrorhynchus) LC
- Risso's dolphin (Grampus griseus) LC
- Northern right whale dolphin (Lissodelphis borealis) LC
- Pacific white-sided dolphin (Sagmatias obliquidens) LC
- Orca (Orcinus orca) DD
- False killer whale (Pseudorca crassidens) NT
- Striped dolphin (Stenella coeruleoalba) LC

=== Porpoises (Phocoenidae) ===
- Harbour porpoise (Phocoena phocoena) LC
- Dall's porpoise (Phocoenoides dalli) LC

=== Sperm whales (Balaenopteridae) ===
- Sperm whale (Physeter macrocephalus) VU

=== Dwarf sperm whales (Kogiidae) ===
- Pygmy sperm whale (Kogia breviceps) LC
- Dwarf sperm whale (Kogia sima) LC

=== Beaked whales (Ziphiidae) ===
- Baird's beaked whale (Berardius bairdii) LC
- Hubbs' beaked whale (Mesoplodon carlhubbsi) DD
- Stejneger's beaked whale (Mesoplodon stejnegeri) NT
- Cuvier's beaked whale (Ziphius cavirostris) LC

=== Rorquals (Balaenopteridae) ===
- Common minke whale (Balaenoptera acutorostrata) LC
- Sei whale (Balaenoptera borealis) EN
- Blue whale (Balaenoptera musculus) EN
- Fin whale (Balaenoptera physalus) VU
- Humpback whale (Megaptera novaeangliae) LC
- Grey whale (Eschrichtius robustus) LC

== See also ==
- Fauna of Canada
- Lists of mammals by region
- List of mammals of Canada
