= List of mammals of Canada =

This is a list of the mammal species recorded in Canada. The Wild Species 2020 report, the most recent national assessment of the general status of species in Canada, records 223 known mammal species in the country. Canada's large territorial size, which spans fifteen terrestrial and five marine ecozones ranging from oceanic coasts to mountains, plains and urban areas, means that it can harbour a great variety of species, including a large share of the world's cetaceans. The largest marine ecozone is the Arctic Archipelago whereas the terrestrial ecozone is the Boreal Shield. The most well represented order is that of the rodents, and the smallest that of the Didelphimorphia (common opossums).

Mammals occurring in Canada are also assessed by the Committee on the Status of Endangered Wildlife in Canada (COSEWIC), which evaluates species, subspecies and geographically or genetically distinct populations, collectively termed wildlife species. As of the May 2025 assessment period, 86 mammal wildlife species had been placed in COSEWIC's risk categories: one extirpated, 35 endangered, 15 threatened and 30 of special concern. A further five were assessed as extinct, 46 as not at risk and seven as data deficient. Because COSEWIC assesses units below the species level, these counts are not directly comparable to a count of species.

Studies of mammals in Canada hearken back to the 1795 northern explorations of Samuel Hearne, whose account is considered surprisingly accurate. The first seminal work on Canadian mammals, however, was John Richardson's 1829 Fauna Boreali-Americana. Joseph Burr Tyrrell was the first to attempt to produce, in 1888, a comprehensive list of Canadian mammalian species. Ernest Thompson Seton and Charles-Eusèbe Dionne's work were also important. Modern Canadian publications with interest in mammalogy include The Canadian Field-Naturalist, the Canadian Journal of Zoology and the French-language Le Naturaliste Canadien.^{[A]}

Several species of mammal have particular symbolism. The Canadian horse and North American beaver are official symbols of Canada,^{[B]} and several provinces have designated native species as symbols.

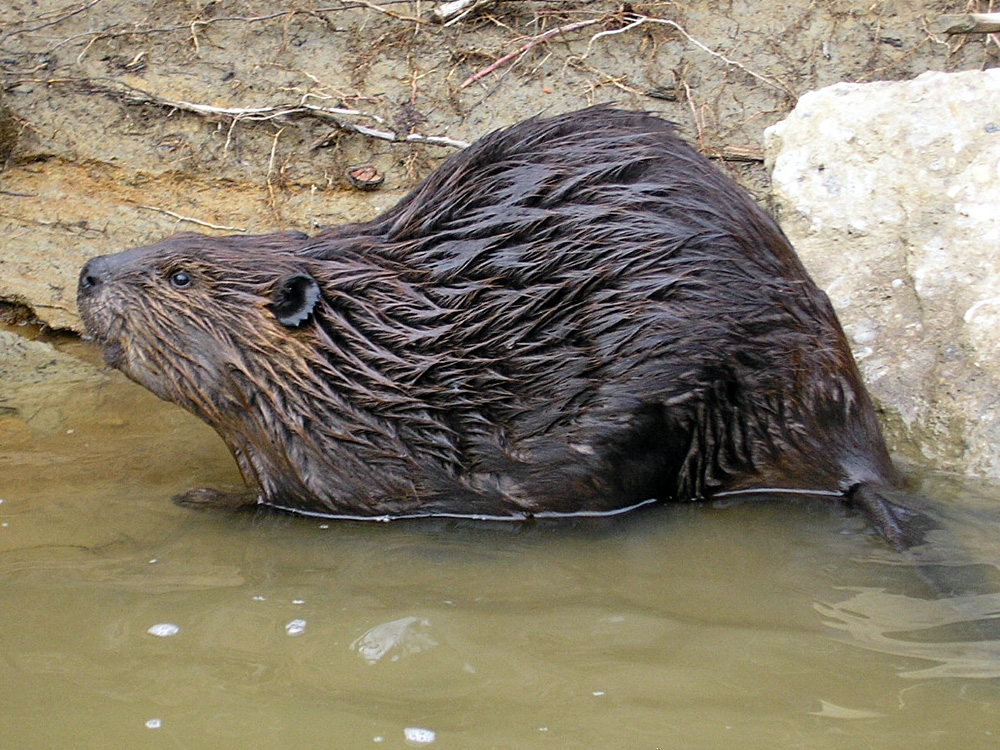
The North American beaver, Castor canadensis, is the national animal of Canada

Icons which state each species' global IUCN status:
CR	Critically Endangered	In imminent risk of extinction in the wild
EN	Endangered	Facing an extremely high risk of extinction in the wild
VU	Vulnerable	Facing a high risk of extinction in the wild
NT	Near Threatened	Doesn't meet any criteria that would categorise it as risking extinction but likely to in the future
LC	Least Concern	No current identifiable risks to this species
DD	Data Deficient	Inadequate information to make an assessment of the risks to this species

(IUCN statuses in the tables below were taken from Red List version 2013.2 and are current as of March 5, 2014.)

== Native mammals ==
=== Bats ===
Bats' most distinguishing feature is that their forelimbs are developed as wings, making them the only mammals capable of flight. Bat species account for about 20% of all mammals.

Common name (French name)	Species (authority)	Preferred habitat	Native range	Status
Family Vespertilionidae: vesper bats
Pallid bat (Chauve-souris blonde)	Antrozous pallidus (LeConte, 1856)	Dry plains	British Columbia	I: LC least concern; CA: threatened; BC: Red List
Townsend's big-eared bat (Oreillard de Townsend)	Corynorhinus townsendii (Cooper, 1837)	Open woodlands	Southern British Columbia	I: LC least concern; BC: Blue List
Big brown bat (Grande chauve-souris brune)	Eptesicus fuscus (Palisot de Beauvois, 1796)	Varied, including cities	British Columbia to southern Quebec and New Brunswick	I: LC least concern
Spotted bat (Oreillard maculé)	Euderma maculatum (J. A. Allen, 1891)	Near waterways	Inner British Columbia	I: LC least concern; CA: special concern; BC: Blue List
Silver-haired bat (Chauve-souris argentée)	Lasionycteris noctivagans (La Conte, 1831)	Deciduous forest lakes	All of southern Canada except Gaspesia and northern Maritimes	I: LC least concern; QC: listing candidate
Western red bat (Chauve-souris rousse de l'Ouest)	Lasiurus blossevillii (Lesson and Garnot, 1826)	Open spaces and cities	Southwestern British Columbia	I: LC least concern
Eastern red bat (Chauve-souris rousse de l'Est)	Lasiurus borealis (Müller, 1776)	Open spaces and cities	Alberta to southern Maritimes	I: LC least concern; QC: listing candidate
Hoary bat (Chauve-souris cendré)	Lasiurus cinereus (Palisot de Beauvois, 1796)	Forests	British Columbia to northern Hudson Bay and Maritimes	I: LC least concern; QC: listing candidate
California myotis (Chauve-souris de Californie)	Myotis californicus (Audubon & Bachman, 1842)	West Coast forest	West Coast and Okanagan Valley	I: LC least concern
Western small-footed myotis (Chauve-souris pygmée de l'Ouest)	Myotis ciliolabrum (Merriam, 1886)	Dry areas	Southern Alberta and Saskatchewan	I: LC least concern; BC: Blue List
Long-eared myotis (Chauve-souris à longues oreilles)	Myotis evotis (H. Allen, 1864)	Varied	Southern British Columbia, Alberta and Saskatchewan	I: LC least concern; QC: listing candidate
Keen's myotis (Chauve-souris de Keen)	Myotis keenii (Merriam, 1895)	Forests	West Coast	I: LC least concern; CA: data deficient; BC: unknown
Eastern small-footed myotis (Chauve-souris pygmée de l'Est)	Myotis leibii (Audubon & Bachman, 1842)	Montane forest	Southern and south-central Ontario, southwestern Quebec	I: EN least concern; QC: listing candidate
Little brown bat (Petite chauve-souris brune)	Myotis lucifugus (La Conte, 1831)	Varied, including cities	Yukon to Atlantic Canada	I: EN least concern
Northern long-eared myotis (Vespertilion nordique or Chauve-souris nordique)	Myotis septentrionalis (Trouessart, 1897)	Forests	Central to Eastern Canada	I: NT least concern; BC: Blue List
Fringed myotis (Chauve-souris à queue frangée)	Myotis thysanodes (Miller, 1897)	White pine forest	Southcentral British Columbia	I: LC least concern; CA: data deficient; BC: Blue List
Long-legged myotis (Chauve-souris à longues pattes)	Myotis volans (H. Allen, 1866)	Varied	British Columbia and Alberta	I: LC least concern
Yuma myotis (Chauve-souris de Yuma)	Myotis yumanensis (H. Allen, 1864)	Open areas	West Coast and Okanagan Valley	I: LC least concern
Tri-colored bat formerly eastern pipistrelle (Pipistrelle de l'Est)	Pipistrellus subflavus (F. Cuvier, 1832)	Forest, fields and waterways	Southern Ontario, Quebec and Maritimes	I: VU least concern; QC: listing candidate

=== Carnivorans ===
Carnivorans include over 260 species, the majority of which eat meat as their primary dietary item. They have a characteristic skull shape and dentition.

Common name (French name)	Species (authority)	Preferred habitat	Native range	Status
Family Felidae: felines
Canada lynx (Lynx du Canada)	Lynx canadensis (Kerr, 1792)	Forests	Most of Canada	I: LC least concern; NB: regionally endangered; NS: endangered
Bobcat (Lynx roux)	Lynx rufus (Schreber, 1777)	Varied	Southern Canada	I: LC least concern
Cougar (Puma)	Puma concolor (Linnaeus, 1771)	Mountain, marshes, dense forest	Mountainous regions of Alberta, British Columbia, and the Yukon	I: LC least concern; Eastern population: CA: data deficient; ON: endangered; QC: listing candidate; NB: endangered
Family Canidae: canines
Coyote (Coyote)	Canis latrans (Say, 1823)	Varied	Rocky Mountains, southern Prairies, southern Ontario, Quebec, and Maritime provinces	I: LC least concern
Grey wolf (Loup)	Canis lupus (Linnaeus, 1758)	Varied	All of Canada, except Anticosti and Prince Edward Island. Extirpated in several areas. Population of the Arctic subspecies resides in Northern Canada.	I: LC least concern
Eastern wolf (Loup oriental)	Canis lycaon (Schreber, 1775)	Varied	Great Lakes region in southeastern Canada (Manitoba, Ontario, Quebec)	I: NE not evaluated; CA: designated special concern (as C. l. lycaon)
Red wolf (Loup rouge)	Canis rufus (Audubon & Bachman, 1851)	Varied	Once ranged into Ontario; extirpated.	I: CR critically endangered
Arctic fox (Renard arctique or polaire)	Vulpes lagopus (Linnaeus, 1758)	Tundra	Northern Canada	I: LC least concern
Swift fox (Renard véloce)	Vulpes velox (Say, 1823)	Desert and dry prairie	Southern Prairie Provinces	I: LC least concern; CA: endangered; AB: endangered
Red fox (Renard roux)	Vulpes vulpes (Linnaeus, 1758)	Varied	All of Canada except part of the Arctic Islands and West Coast	I: LC least concern
Family Ursidae: bears
Black bear (Ours noir)	Ursus americanus (Pallas, 1780)	Varied, mostly forested areas	Most of Canada except Arctic and Prince Edward Island	I: LC least concern
Grizzly bear (Ours brun)	Ursus arctos horribilis (Linnaeus, 1758)	Open spaces, mostly alpine and Arctic tundra	Yukon, most of British Columbia except Vancouver Island, Rocky Mountains, mainland Northwest Territory and Nunavut	I: LC least concern; CA: special concern; AB: recommended for threatened; NWT: sensitive; BC: Blue List
Polar bear (Ours blanc or polaire)	Ursus maritimus (Phipps, 1774)	Edge of ice fields	Arctic Sea and coasts	I: VU vulnerable; CA: special concern; BC: Yellow List; NWT: sensitive; QC: listing candidate; NF: vulnerable
Family Procyonidae: raccoons and allies
Raccoon (Raton laveur)	Procyon lotor (Linnaeus, 1758)	Riparian forest	Southern Canada except Rockies	I: LC least concern
Family Mustelidae: mustelids
Sea otter (Loutre de mer)	Enhydra lutris (Linnaeus, 1758)	Sea and coast	Vancouver and Goose Island coast	I: EN endangered; CA: threatened; BC: Red List
Northern river otter (Loutre de rivière)	Lontra canadensis (Schreber, 1777)	Rivers, lakes and swamps	Most of Canada except part of the Arctic and southern Prairies	I: LC least concern
Wolverine (Carcajou)	Gulo gulo (Linnaeus, 1758)	Boreal forest, Arctic tundra	Largely extinct in southern Canada west of the Rockies - found in much of continental Canada and the Arctic islands	I: LC least concern; Eastern population: CA: endangered; ON: threatened; QC: endangered; NF: endangered; Western population: CA: special concern; BC: varies
American marten (Martre d'Amérique)	Martes americana (Turton, 1806)	Coniferous and mixed forests	Rockies to Labrador and Newfoundland, except Prairies - extinct in several parts of Eastern Canada	I: LC least concern; NS: endangered; NF: endangered
Pacific marten (Martre du Pacifique)	Martes caurina (Merriam, 1890)	Coniferous and mixed forests	West coast up to Yukon down to British Columbia and the Rockies	I: not evaluated
Beringian ermine (Hermine béringienne)	Mustela erminea (Linnaeus, 1758)	Boreal forest, Arctic tundra	Most of Arctic Canada aside from parts of eastern Nunavut and Baffin Island	I: LC least concern
Haida ermine (Hermine Haïda)	Mustela haidarum (Preble, 1898)	Temperate rainforest	Haida Gwaii archipelago	I: NE not evaluated; ssp. haidarum; CA: threatened; BC: Red List
Black-footed ferret (Putois à pieds noirs)	Mustela nigripes (Audubon and Bachman, 1851)	Prairies and grasslands	Extirpated; once inhabited southern Alberta and southern Saskatchewan	I: EN endangered; CA: reintroduced, once again extirpated
Least weasel (Belette pygmée)	Mustela nivalis (Linnaeus, 1766)	Varied	Yukon to Labrador, except southern Quebec and Ontario	I: LC least concern; QC: listing candidate
American ermine (Hermine américaine)	Mustela richardsonii (Bonaparte, 1838)	Varied	Almost all of Canada south of the Arctic, except part of southern Prairies and Anticosti Island.	I: NE not evaluated; ssp. anguinae; BC: Blue List
Long-tailed weasel (Belette à longue queue)	Neogale frenata (Lichtenstein, 1831)	Open areas	Southern Rockies to western Ontario, southern Ontario to western Nova Scotia	I: LC least concern
Mink (Vison d'Amérique)	Neogale vison (Schreber, 1777)	Wetlands and rivers	Most of Canada, except the Arctic, part of the Prairies and Anticosti Island - introduced to Newfoundland	I: LC least concern
Fisher (Pékan)	Pekania pennanti (Erxleben, 1777)	Coniferous and mixed forests near rivers	British Columbia to central Quebec, reintroduced in parts of the Maritimes	I: LC least concern; BC: Blue List
Badger (Blaireau d'Amérique)	Taxidea taxus (Schreber, 1777)	Fields	Southern Prairies, south-central British Columbia and southernmost Ontario	I: LC least concern; CA: endangered (jeffersoni and jacksoni); BC: Red List
Family Mephitidae: skunks
Striped skunk (Moufette rayée)	Mephitis mephitis (Schreber, 1776)	Forests, cultivated areas, valleys	Rockies to the Maritimes - introduced in Prince Edward Island and Nova Scotia in the 19th century	I: LC least concern
Western spotted skunk (Moufette tachetée occidentale)	Spilogale gracilis (Merriam, 1890)	Thickets and bushes	Southwestern British Columbia	I: LC least concern (IUCN); I: secure (TNC)
Superfamily Pinnipedia: pinnipeds
Family Otariidae: eared seals
Northern fur seal (Otarie à fourrure)	Callorhinus ursinus (Linnaeus, 1758)	Sea	Off the coast of British Columbia; appreciates rocky outcrops - occasionally reported from the Arctic	I: VU vulnerable; BC: Red List
Steller sea lion (Otarie de Steller)	Eumetopias jubatus (Schreber, 1776)	Coast waters	British Columbia; appreciates rocky outcrops	I: NT near threatened; BC: Blue List; ssp. monteriensis: I: LC least concern
Walrus (Morse)	Odobenus rosmarus (Linnaeus, 1758)	Arctic shallows	James Bay to Greenland - extinct in the Western Arctic and the Magdalen Islands	I: VU data deficient
California sea lion (Otarie de Californie)	Zalophus californianus ((Lesson, 1828))	Coast waters	Near Vancouver Island	I: LC least concern
Family Phocidae: earless seals
Hooded seal (Phoque à capuchon)	Cystophora cristata (Erxleben, 1777)	Sea	Atlantic from Gulf of the Saint Lawrence to northern Baffin Island	I: VU vulnerable
Bearded seal (Phoque barbu)	Erignathus barbatus (Erxleben, 1777)	Sea	Arctic Ocean	I: LC least concern
Grey seal (Phoque gris)	Halichoerus grypus (Erxleben, 1777)	Sea rocks, and reefs	East Coast	I: LC least concern
Northern elephant seal (Éléphant de mer du Nord)	Mirounga angustirostris (Gill, 1866)	Tropical and temperate sea waters	Occasional in British Columbia	I: LC least concern
Harp seal (Phoque du Groenland)	Phoca groenlandica (Erxleben, 1777)	Cold waters	Gulf of Saint Lawrence to James Bay and Greenland	I: LC least concern
Harbour seal (Phoque commun)	Phoca vitulina (Linnaeus, 1758)	Coast waters and some interior lakes	Most Canadian coasts except the colder part of the Arctic	I: LC least concern; QC: ssp. mellonae listing candidate
Ringed seal (Phoque annelé)	Pusa hispida (Schreber, 1775)	Arctic waters and ice-floes	Arctic Ocean	I: LC least concern

=== Cetaceans ===
Cetaceans includes whales, dolphins and porpoises. They are the mammals most fully adapted to aquatic life with a spindle-shaped nearly hairless body, protected by a thick layer of blubber, and forelimbs and tail modified to provide propulsion underwater.

Common name (French name)	Species (authority)	Preferred habitat	Native range	Status
Family Balaenidae: right whales
Bowhead whale (Baleine boréale)	Balaena mysticetus (Linnaeus, 1758)	Polar ice shelf in winter, coastal waters in the summer	Arctic Ocean	I: LC least concern; CA: at risk
North Atlantic right whale (Baleine franche)	Eubalaena glacialis (Linnaeus, 1758)	Temperate coast waters	North Atlantic	I: CR endangered; CA: endangered; QC: listing candidate
North Pacific right whale (Baleine franche)	Eubalaena japonica (Lacépède, 1818)		North Pacific	I: EN endangered; CA: endangered; Northeast Pacific subpopulation: I: CR critically endangered
Family Balaenopteridae: rorquals
Northern minke whale (Petit rorqual)	Balaenoptera acutorostrata (Lacépède, 1804)	Temperate or polar seas	Northern Atlantic and Pacific	I: LC least concern; CA: not at risk
Sei whale (Rorqual boréal)	Balaenoptera borealis (Lesson, 1828)	Temperate seas	Atlantic and Pacific oceans	I: EN endangered; Pacific: CA: BC: Blue List; Atlantic: CA: data deficient
Blue whale (Rorqual bleu)	Balaenoptera musculus (Linnaeus, 1758)	Temperate and polar waters	Atlantic and Pacific oceans	I: EN endangered; ssp. musculus (North Pacific stock): I: LR/cd lower risk/conservation dependent; CA: endangered; BC: Blue List; ssp. musculus (North Atlantic stock): I: VU vulnerable; CA: endangered; QC: listing candidate; ssp. brevicauda: I: DD data deficient
Fin whale (Rorqual commun)	Balaenoptera physalus (Linnaeus, 1758)	Pelagic, coastal	Atlantic and Pacific oceans	I: VU endangered; CA: threatened/special concern; BC: Blue List; QC: listing candidate
Humpback whale (Baleine à bosse)	Megaptera novaeangliae (Borowski, 1781)	Coastal waters, often penetrates estuaries	Atlantic and Pacific oceans	I: LC least concern; CA: threatened/not at risk; BC: Blue List
Family Eschrichtiidae: grey whale
Grey whale (Baleine grise)	Eschrichtius robustus (Lilljebor, 1861)	Temperate continental shelf waters	Pacific Coast	I: LC least concern; Western subpopulation: I: EN critically endangered, but Canada is not in the range description; CA: special concern; BC: Blue List
Family Monodontidae: narwhal and beluga
Narwhal (Narval)	Monodon monoceros (Linnaeus, 1758)	Edge of Arctic ice sheet	Eastern Arctic Ocean	I: LC near threatened/apparently secure; CA: special concern
Beluga (Bélouga)	Delphinapterus leucas (Pallas, 1776)	Arctic coast waters - often swim deep up rivers	Eastern and Western Arctic Ocean	I: LC near threatened; CA: Varied; QC: threatened/listing candidate; ON: not at risk
Family Phocoenidae: porpoises
Harbour porpoise (Marsouin commun)	Phocoena phocoena (Linnaeus, 1758)		East and West Coast	I: LC least concern; CA: special concern; BC: Blue List
Dall's porpoise (Marsouin de Dall)	Phocoenoides dalli (True, 1885)	Continental shelf	North Pacific	I: LC least concern
Family Physeteridae: sperm whale
Sperm whale (Cachalot)	Physeter macrocephalus (Linnaeus, 1758)	Very deep waters	Pacific and Atlantic Oceans - only migrating males are found in Canadian waters	I: VU vulnerable; CA: not at risk; BC: Blue List
Family Ziphidae: beaked whales
Cuvier's beaked whale (Baleine à bec de Cuvier)	Ziphius cavirostris (G. Cuvier, 1823)	Uncertain	North Pacific and Atlantic	I: LC least concern; CA: not at risk
Baird's beaked whale (Grande baleine à bec)	Berardius bairdii (Stejneger, 1883)	Near continental shelf cliffs	North Pacific	I: LC data deficient; CA: not at risk
Northern bottlenose whale (Baleine à bec commune)	Hyperoodon ampullatus (Forster, 1770)	Subarctic waters	North Atlantic and part of Arctic	I: NT data deficient; CA: endangered
Sowerby's beaked whale (Baleine à bec de Sowerby)	Mesoplodon bidens (Sowerby, 1804)	Deep ocean	Temperate North Atlantic	I: LC data deficient; CA: special concern
Hubbs' beaked whale (Baleine à bec de Moore)	Mesoplodon carlhubbsi (Moore, 1963)	Temperate waters	North Pacific	I: DD data deficient; CA: not at risk
Stejneger's beaked whale (Baleine à bec de Stejneger)	Mesoplodon stejnegeri (True, 1885)	Cold, high sea	North Pacific	I: NT data deficient; CA: not at risk
Family Delphinidae: oceanic dolphins
White-beaked dolphin (Dauphin à bec blanc)	Lagenorhynchus albirostris (Gray, 1846)	High, cold sea	North Atlantic	I: LC least concern
Atlantic white-sided dolphin (Dauphin à flancs blancs)	Leucopleurus acutus (Gray, 1828)	Temperate high sea	North Atlantic	I: LC least concern
Common bottlenose dolphin (Grand dauphin)	Tursiops truncatus (Montagu, 1821)	Coastal waters	Occasional in the Maritimes	I: LC least concern
Short-beaked common dolphin (Dauphin commun à bec court)	Delphinus delphis (Linnaeus, 1758)	Temperate high sea	Atlantic and Pacific Continental shelves	I: LC least concern
Pacific white-sided dolphin (Dauphin à flancs blancs du pacifique)	Sagmatias obliquidens (Gill, 1865)	Temperate and subarctic seas	North Pacific	I: LC least concern
Orca (Épaulard or orque)	Orcinus orca (Linnaeus, 1758)	Prefers coastal waters	Atlantic, Pacific and parts of the Arctic	I: DD data deficient; CA: varies; BC: varies
Short-finned pilot whale (Globicéphale du Pacifique)	Globicephala macrorhynchus (Gray, 1846)	Varied	Pacific Ocean	I: LC data deficient; CA: not at risk
Long-finned pilot whale (Globicéphale de l'Atlantique)	Globicephala melas (Traill, 1809)	Varied	North Atlantic	I: LC data deficient

=== Even-toed ungulates ===
The even-toed ungulates are ungulates whose weight is borne about equally by the third and fourth toes, rather than mostly or entirely by the third as in perissodactyls. There are about 220 artiodactyl species worldwide, including many that are of great economic importance.

Common name (French name)	Species (authority)	Preferred habitat	Native range	Status
Family Cervidae: deer
Moose (Orignal)	Alces alces (Linnaeus, 1758)	Subarctic and open forests	Yukon to New Brunswick - introduced in Newfoundland, Cape Breton and Anticosti Islands	I: LC least concern; NS: endangered
Elk (Wapiti)	Cervus canadensis (Linnaeus, 1758)	Varied, prefers open areas	Southern Rockies and part of the Prairies, reintroduced in several part of its former range.	I: LC least concern; ssp roosevelti; BC: Blue List
Mule deer (Cerf mulet)	Odocoileus hemionus (Rafinesque, 1817)	Subarctic and open forests	West Coast to Prairies	I: LC least concern; MB: threatened
White-tailed deer (Cerf de Virginie)	Odocoileus virginianus (Zimmerman, 1780)	Glens, rivers, marshes, forest edges	Southern Rockies and Prairie Provinces to coast of Labrador and Maritimes - introduced to the Anticosti Islands	I: LC least concern
Caribou (Caribou)	Rangifer tarandus (Zimmerman, 1780)	Tundra, Taiga and boreal forest	Boreal forest across Canada, and parts of the Arctic and Rockies	I: VU least concern; AB: caribou & groenlandicus threatened; MB: caribou threatened; QC: threatened; NF: caribou threatened; BC: varies
Family Antilocapridae: pronghorn
Pronghorn (Antilope d'Amérique or pronghorn)	Antilocapra americana (Ord, 1815)	Prairies and plains	Southern Saskatchewan and Alberta	I: LC least concern
Family Bovidae: bovids
American bison (Bison)	Bison bison (Linnaeus, 1758)	Varied	South of the Great Slaves Lake - small reintroduced population found in several parts of its former range	I: NT near threatened; AB: endangered; BC: Red List
Mountain goat (Chèvre de montagne)	Oreamnos americanus (Blainville, 1816)	Mountains	Various parts of the Western Cordillera	I: LC least concern
Muskox (Boeuf musqué)	Ovibos moschatus (Zimmermann, 1780)	Arctic tundra	Canadian Arctic	I: LC least concern
Bighorn sheep (Mouflon d'Amérique)	Ovis canadensis (Shaw, 1804)	Alpine prairies	South and southeastern Rockies	I: LC least concern; BC: Blue List
Dall sheep (Mouflon de Dall)	Ovis dalli (Nelson, 1884)	Alpine tundra	Yukon and northern British Columbia	I: LC least concern; ssp. dalli: BC: Blue List

=== Marsupials ===
Didelphimorphia is the order of common opossums of the Western Hemisphere. Opossums probably diverged from the basic South American marsupials in the late Cretaceous or early Paleocene. They are small to medium-sized marsupials, about the size of a large house cat, with a long snout and prehensile tail.

Common name (French name)	Species (authority)	Preferred habitat	Native range	Status
Family Didelphidae: New World opossums
Virginia opossum (Opossum d'Amérique or de Virginie)	Didelphis virginiana (Kerr, 1792)	Humid lowland forest	Southwestern Ontario, introduced in British Columbia	I: LC least concern

=== Rabbits, hares, and pikas ===
The lagomorphs comprise two families, Leporidae (hares and rabbits), and Ochotonidae (pikas). They can resemble rodents, but differ in a number of physical characteristics, such as having four incisors in the upper jaw rather than two.

Common name (French name)	Species (authority)	Preferred habitat	Native range	Status
Family Ochotonidae: pikas
Collared pika (Pica à collier)	Ochotona collaris (Nelson, 1893)	Mountains above the tree line	Rockies of the Yukon	I: LC least concern
American pika (Pica d'Amérique)	Ochotona princeps (Richardson, 1828)	Mountains near the tree line	Southern British Columbia and Alberta	I: LC least concern
Family Leporidae: rabbits and hares
Snowshoe hare (Lièvre d'Amérique)	Lepus americanus (Erxleben, 1777)	Forests	Much of mainland Canada except southernmost Ontario	I: LC least concern ssp. washingtonii; BC: Red List
Arctic hare (Lièvre arctique)	Lepus arcticus (Ross, 1819)	Tundra	Canadian Arctic (including Arctic Archipelago), Labrador, Newfoundland	I: LC least concern
White-tailed jackrabbit (Lièvre de Townsend)	Lepus townsendii (Bachman, 1839)	Fields	Southern Prairies, Okanagan Valley	I: LC least concern; BC: Red List
Eastern cottontail (Lapin à queue blanche)	Sylvilagus floridanus (J. A. Allen, 1890)	Open woodlands	Southern Manitoba, Saskatchewan Ontario and Quebec	I: LC least concern
Mountain cottontail (Lapin de Nuttall)	Sylvilagus nuttallii (J. A. Allen, 1890)	Dry plains	Southern Alberta and Saskatchewan, Okanagan and Similkameen valleys	I: LC least concern; BC: Blue List ssp. nuttallii CA: special concern
New England cottontail (Lapin de Nouvelle-Angleterre)	Sylvilagus transitionalis (Bangs, 1895)	High elevation forests	Presence uncertain in Quebec, possibly extant	I: VU vulnerable

=== Rodents ===
Rodents make up the largest order of mammals, with over 40% of mammalian species. They have two incisors in the upper and lower jaw which grow continually and must be kept short by gnawing. Most rodents are small though the capybara, a rodent native to South America, can weigh up to 45 kg (100 lb).

Common name (French name)	Species (authority)	Preferred habitat	Native range	Status
Family Erethizontidae: New World porcupines
North American porcupine (Porc-épic d'Amérique)	Erethizon dorsatum (Linnaeus, 1758)	Forests south of the tree line	All of Canada except Arctic	I: LC least concern
Family Aplodontiidae: mountain beaver
Mountain beaver (Castor de montagne)	Aplodontia rufa (Rafinesque, 1817)	Montane forest	Southern British Columbia	I: LC least concern; CA: special concern; BC: Blue List
Family Castoridae: beavers
North American beaver (Castor)	Castor canadensis (Kuhl, 1820)	Humid areas of forests	All of Canada below the tree line except drier parts of the Prairies	I: LC least concern
Family Sciuridae: squirrels
Eastern grey squirrel (Écureuil gris)	Sciurus carolinensis (Gmelin, 1788)	Prefers deep forest, but frequent in urban areas	Southern Manitoba and northwestern Ontario, southern Quebec, Ontario and New Brunswick	I: LC least concern
Eastern fox squirrel (Écureuil fauve)	Sciurus niger (Linnaeus, 1758)	Edges of forests and groves	Southern Manitoba and Saskatchewan, British Columbia and Pelee Island	I: LC least concern
Douglas squirrel (Écureuil de Douglas)	Tamiasciurus douglasii (Bachman, 1839)	Coniferous forest	Southwestern British Columbia	I: LC least concern
American red squirrel (Écureuil roux)	Tamiasciurus hudsonicus (Erxleben, 1839)	Forests	Mainland Canada south of the tree line, except the southern Prairies and southwestern British Columbia; Vancouver Island	I: LC least concern
Humboldt's flying squirrel	Glaucomys oregonensis (Bachman, 1839)	Boreal forest	Southern British Columbia continuing south through the US border	I: not evaluated
Northern flying squirrel (Grand polatouche)	Glaucomys sabrinus (Shaw, 1801)	Boreal forest	Mainland Canada south of the tree line except the southern Prairies	I: LC least concern
Southern flying squirrel (Petit polatouche)	Glaucomys volans (Linnaeus, 1758)	Deciduous forest	Southern Ontario, part of Quebec, southern Nova Scotia	I: LC least concern; QC: listing candidate
Black-tailed prairie dog (Chien de prairie à queue noire)	Cynomys ludovicianus (Ord, 1815)	Dry prairies	Small part of southern Saskatchewan	I: LC least concern; CA: special concern
Hoary marmot (Marmotte des Rocheuses)	Marmota caligata (Eschscholtz, 1829)	Alpine tundra	Rockies, Columbia, and Coast Mountains	I: LC least concern
Yellow-bellied marmot (Marmotte à ventre jaune)	Marmota flaviventris (Audubon and Bachman, 1841)	Mountains	Central British Columbia and southernmost Alberta	I: LC least concern
Groundhog (Marmotte commune, siffleux)	Marmota monax (Linnaeus, 1758)	Broken ground	Much of mainland Canada east of the Rockies, inland valleys and part of western Yukon	I: LC least concern
Vancouver Island marmot (Marmotte de Vancouver)	Marmota vancouverensis (Swarth, 1911)	Near the mountain tree line	Endemic to Vancouver Island	I: CR critically endangered; CA: endangered; BC: Red List
Golden-mantled ground squirrel (Spermophile à mante dorée)	Callospermophilus lateralis (Say, 1823)	Montane coniferous forest	Southeastern Rockies	I: LC lower risk/conservation dependent
Cascade golden-mantled ground squirrel (Spermophile à mante dorée des Cascades)	Callospermophilus saturatus (Rhoads, 1895)	Southern British Columbia Cascade Range	British Columbia	I: LC least concern
Franklin's ground squirrel (Écureuil terrestre de Franklin)	Poliocitellus franklinii (Sabine, 1822)	Parklands	Northwestern Ontario and southern Prairies except short-grass prairies	*I: LC least concern
Thirteen-lined ground squirrel (Spermophile rayé)	Ictidomys tridecemlineatus (Mitchill, 1821)	Groves, swamps, uncultivated land	Southern Prairie Provinces	I: LC least concern
Columbian ground squirrel (Spermophile du Columbia)	Urocitellus columbianus (Ord, 1815)	Montane open areas	Southern Rocky mountains	I: LC least concern
Arctic ground squirrel (Spermophile arctique)	Urocitellus parryii (Richardson, 1825)	Tundra without permafrost	Mainland Arctic	I: LC least concern
Richardson's ground squirrel (Spermophile de Richardson)	Urocitellus richardsonii (Sabine, 1822)	Prairies	South of the Prairie provinces	I: LC least concern
Yellow-pine chipmunk (Tamia amène)	Tamias amoenus (Allen, 1821)	Dry montane forest	Southern and central British Columbia and Alberta	I: LC least concern
Least chipmunk (Tamia mineur)	Tamias minimus (Bachman, 1839)	Edges of forests, groves, but also open spaces	Western Quebec to Yukon	I: LC least concern; ssp. selkirki; AB:
Red-tailed chipmunk (Tamia à queue rousse)	Tamias ruficaudus (A. H. Howell, 1839)	High altitude forest and valley pine groves	Southern British Columbia and Alberta	I: LC least concern; CA: vulnerable; AB: may be at risk; BC: Imperiled
Eastern chipmunk (Tamia rayé, Petit suisse)	Tamias striatus (Linnaeus, 1758)	Deciduous forest	Maritime provinces, and the southern half of Quebec, Ontario, and Manitoba	I: LC least concern
Townsend's chipmunk (Tamia de Townsend)	Tamias townsendii (Bachman, 1839)	Western Coast lowland and montane tsuga forests	Southwestern British Columbia	I: LC least concern
Family Geomyidae: pocket gophers
Plains pocket gopher (Gaufre brun)	Geomys bursarius (Shaw, 1800)	Fields and banks	Southern Manitoba	I: LC least concern; CA: not at risk
Northern pocket gopher (Gaufre gris)	Thomomys talpoides (Richardson, 1828)	Open areas	Southern Prairie Provinces and British Columbia	I: LC least concern; ssp. douglasii vulnerable; ssp. segregatus near threatened; BC: secure; ssp. segregatus Red List
Family Heteromyidae: heteromyids
Ord's kangaroo rat (Rat-kangourou d'Ord)	Dipodomys ordii (Woodhouse, 1853)	Semi-deserctic areas	Great Sand Hills area	I: LC least concern; CA: special concern; AB: endangered
Olive-backed pocket mouse (Souris à abajoues des plaines)	Perognathus fasciatus (Wied-Neuwied, 1839)	Dry plains	Southern Prairies	I: LC least concern; CA: sensitive
Great Basin pocket mouse (Souris à abajoues des pinèdes)	Perognathus parvus (Peale, 1848)	Dry plains	Great Basin	I: LC least concern; CA: sensitive; BC: Red List
Family Dipodidae: jerboas
Woodland jumping mouse (Souris sauteuse des bois)	Napaeozapus insignis (Miller, 1891)	Forest streams	Eastern Canada	I: LC least concern
Meadow jumping mouse (Souris sauteuse des champs)	Zapus hudsonius (Zimmermann, 1780)	Wet fields	Eastern Canada (except Anticosti island and Newfoundland) to Yukon	I: LC least concern ssp. alascensis; BC: Blue List
Western jumping mouse (Souris sauteuse de l'ouest)	Zapus princeps (Allen, 1893)	Prairies	Rockies and Prairies	I: LC least concern
Pacific jumping mouse (Souris sauteuse du Pacifique)	Zapus trinotatus (Rhoads, 1893)	Montane prairies	Southwestern British Columbia	I: LC least concern
Family Cricetidae: cricetids
Southern red-backed vole (Campagnol à dos roux de Gapper)	Clethrionomys gapperi (Vigors), 1830	Forests	Most of the provinces, except Newfoundland and Vancouver Island	I: LC least concern ssp. galei; BC: Blue List ssp. occidentalis; BC: Red List
Northern red-backed vole (Campagnol à dos roux boréal)	Clethrionomys rutilus (Pallas, 1779)	Shrubby tundra	Mainland Arctic	I: LC least concern
Northern collared lemming (Lemming variable or lemming à collerette)	Dicrostonyx groenlandicus (Traill, 1823)	Tundra	Northern Arctic islands	I: LC least concern
Ungava collared lemming (Lemming d'Ungava)	Dicrostonyx hudsonius (Pallas, 1778)	Tundra	Northern Quebec	I: LC least concern
Victoria collared lemming (Lemming à collerette)	Dicrostonyx kilangmiutak (Anderson & Rand, 1945)	Tundra	Mainland Arctic, Banks, Victoria and King Williams Islands	I: LC least concern
Ogilvie Mountains collared lemming (—)	Dicrostonyx nunatakensis (Youngman, 1967)	Montane tundra	Ogilvie Mountains	I: LC least concern (IUCN); I: critically imperiled (TNC)
Richardson's collared lemming (—)	Dicrostonyx richardsoni (Merriam, 1900)	Tundra	Arctic, roughly south of the Thelon River Basin	I: LC least concern
Sagebrush vole (Campagnol des sauges)	Lemmiscus curtatus (Cope, 1868)	Sagebrush steppes	Southern Alberta and Saskatchewan	I: LC least concern
North American brown lemming (Lemming brun)	Lemmus trimucronatus (Richardson, 1825)		Tundra of Nunavut, Northwest Territories and Yukon, also west coast of British Columbia almost south to Vancouver Island	I: LC least concern
Rock vole (Campagnol des rochers)	Microtus chrotorrhinus (Miller, 1894)	Rocky areas	Boreal Ontario and Quebec; southernmost Labrador; Gaspesia and northern New Brunswick	I: LC least concern; QC: listing candidate; ssp. ravus data deficient
Long-tailed vole (Campagnol longicaude)	Microtus longicaudus (Miller, 1894)	Varied	Western Cordillera	I: LC least concern
Singing vole (Campagnol chanteur)	Microtus miurus (Osgood, 1901)	Alpine tundra	Yukon and neighbouring Northwest Territory	I: LC least concern
Montane vole (Campagnol montagnard)	Microtus montanus (Peale, 1848)	Shortgrass alpine prairies	Central south British Columbia	I: LC least concern
Prairie vole (Campagnol des prairies)	Microtus ochrogaster (Wagner, 1842)	Prairies	Prairie provinces	I: LC least concern
Tundra vole (Campagnol nordique)	Microtus oeconomus (Pallas, 1776)	Wet tundra	Western Arctic	I: LC least concern
Creeping vole (Campagnol de l'oregon)	Microtus oregoni (Bachman, 1839)	Humid coniferous forest	Southern British Columbia	I: LC least concern
Meadow vole (Campagnol des champs)	Microtus pennsylvanicus (Ord, 1815)	Wet fields	All of Canada except Arctic and westernmost ranges	I: LC least concern
Woodland vole (Campagnol sylvestre)	Microtus pinetorum (Le Conte, 1830)	Deciduous forest	Southernmost Ontario and Quebec	I: LC least concern; CA: special concern; QC: listing candidate
Water vole (Campagnol de Richardson)	Microtus richardsoni (De Kay, 1842)	Alpine prairies and streams	Cascades and southern Rockies	I: LC least concern
Townsend's vole (Campagnol de Townsend)	Microtus townsendii (Bachman, 1839)	Saline marshes and fields	Vancouver Island, nearby islands and Fraser River delta	I: LC least concern; ssp. cowani conservation dependent; BC: Red List
Taiga vole (Campagnol à joues jaunes)	Microtus xanthognathus (Leach, 1815)	Forest streams	From southwestern Hudson Bay through northern Prairies and Yukon	I: LC least concern
Muskrat (Rat musqué)	Ondatra zibethicus (Linnaeus, 1766)	Wetlands	Most of Canada outside the Arctic and southwestern British Columbia	I: LC least concern
Western heather vole (Campagnol des bruyères)	Phenacomys intermedius (Merriam, 1889)	Varied	British Columbia	I: LC least concern; ssp. artemisiae near threatened; ssp. sphagnicola near threatened
Eastern heather vole (Phénacomys d'Ungava)	Phenacomys ungava (Merriam, 1889)	Varied	Quebec, Ontario and Labrador to southern Yukon	I: LC least concern
Northern bog lemming (Campagnol-lemming boréal)	Synaptomys borealis (Richardson, 1828)	Peatlands	Labrador to Alaska; Gaspesia and northern New Brunswick	I: LC least concern
Southern bog lemming (Campagnol-lemming de Cooper)	Synaptomys cooperi (Baird, 1857)	Peatlands	Western Manitoba, central and southern Ontario and Quebec, New Brunswick, Nova Scotia	I: LC least concern; QC: listing candidate
Bushy-tailed woodrat (Rat à queue touffue)	Neotoma cinerea (Ord, 1815)	Mountains	Western Cordillera	I: LC least concern
Yukon deer mouse (Souris de yukon)	Peromyscus arcticus (Wagner, 1845)	Forest, mountains	Yukon	I: LC not evaluated
Northwestern deer mouse (Souris de keen)	Peromyscus keeni (Rhoades, 1894)	Mild and rainy forest	West of the Coastal Mountains	I: LC least concern
White-footed mouse (Souris à pattes blanches)	Peromyscus leucopus (Rafinesque, 1818)	Deciduous forest	Southern Alberta, Saskatchewan, Ontario, Quebec and Nova Scotia	I: LC least concern
Eastern deer mouse (Souris sylvestre)	Peromyscus maniculatus (Wagner, 1845)	Anywhere except wetlands	Easternmost Saskatchewan to most of eastern Canada aside from northern Quebec and Newfoundland	I: LC least concern
Western deer mouse (Souris sylvestre)	Peromyscus sonoriensis (Wagner, 1845)	Anywhere except wetlands	Saskatchewan west to British Columbia, north to the southern Northwest Territories and eastern Yukon	I: LC not evaluated
Western harvest mouse (Souris-moissonneuse occidentale)	Reithrodontomys megalotis (Baird, 1858)	Prairies	Okanagan Valley (ssp. dychei), south of Alberta and Saskatchewan (ssp. megalotis)	I: LC least concern; CA: special concern (dychei); CA: endangered (megalotis); BC: Blue List; AB: unknown; SA: unknown
Northern grasshopper mouse (Souris à sauterelles)	Onychomys leucogaster (Wied-Neuwied, 1841)	Southern Prairies	Prairies	I: LC least concern

=== Shrews and moles ===
Eulipotyphlans are insectivorous mammals. Shrews and solenodons closely resemble mice, hedgehogs carry spines, while moles are stout-bodied burrowers.

Common name (French name)	Species (authority)	Preferred habitat	Native range	Status
Family Soricidae: shrews
Northern short-tailed shrew (Grande musaraigne)	Blarina brevicauda (Say, 1823)	Deciduous forest	Eastern Saskatchewan to Maritime provinces	I: LC least concern
North American least shrew (Petite musaraigne)	Cryptotis parva (Say, 1823)	Fields, clearings and salt marshes	Long point, Ontario	I: LC least concern; CA: possibly extirpated
Arctic shrew (Musaraigne arctique)	Sorex arcticus (Kerr, 1792)	Peatlands and marshes	From the Northwest Territory to central Quebec	I: LC least concern
Maritime shrew (Musaraigne des Maritimes)	Sorex maritimensis (Smith, 1939)	Peatlands and marshes	New Brunswick and Nova Scotia	I: LC least concern; The Nature Conservancy: vulnerable
Marsh shrew (Musaraigne de Bendire)	Sorex bendirii (Smith, 1939)	Coniferous forest	Fraser Valley	I: LC least concern; CA: threatened; BC: Red List
Masked shrew (Musaraigne cendrée)	Sorex cinereus (Smith, 1939)	Varied	Most of Mainland Canada except northernmost Quebec; Prince Edward and Cape Breton islands	I: LC least concern
Long-tailed shrew (Musaraigne longicaude)	Sorex dispar (Batchelder, 1911)	Wet banks	New Brunswick	I: LC least concern
Smoky shrew (Musaraigne fuligineuse)	Sorex fumeus (Miller, 1895)	Deciduous forest	Great lakes to Maritimes	I: LC least concern
Gaspé shrew (Musaraigne de Gaspé)	Sorex gaspensis (Anthony & Goodwin, 1924)	Near forest streams	Gaspesia and northern New Brunswick; Cape Breton Island	I: LC least concern; CA: not at risk; QC: listing candidate
Prairie shrew (Musaraigne des steppes)	Sorex haydeni (Baird, 1857)	Grassland	Southern Prairies	I: LC least concern
American pygmy shrew (Musaraigne pygmée)	Sorex hoyi (Baird, 1857)	Forest clearings	Yukon and eastern Cordillera to Labrador and Maritimes	I: LC least concern
Merriam's shrew (Musaraigne de Merriam)	Sorex merriami (Dobson, 1890)	Grasslands	Extreme southern British Columbia	I: LC least concern; BC: Red List
Montane shrew (Musaraigne sombre)	Sorex monticolus (Merriam, 1890)	Montane streams and marshes	Western Cordillera	I: LC least concern
American water shrew (Musaraigne palustre)	Sorex palustris (Richardson, 1828)	Lakes and marshes	Western Cordillera to Labrador and Maritimes except southern Prairies and southernmost Ontario	I: LC least concern ssp. brooksi; BC: Red List
Preble's shrew (Musaraigne de Preble)	Sorex preblei (Jackson,1922)	Montane streams and marshes	Southcentral British Columbia	I: LC least concern; BC: Red List
Trowbridge's shrew (Musaraigne de Trowbridge)	Sorex trowbridgii (Baird, 1857)	Coniferous forest	Lower Fraser Valley	I: LC least concern; BC: Blue List
Tundra shrew (—)	Sorex tundrensis (Merriam, 1900)	Tundra	Yukon and Northwest territory	I: LC least concern; BC: Red List
Barren ground shrew (—)	Sorex ugyunak (Anderson & Rand, 1945)	Tundra	Mainland Arctic	I: LC least concern
Vagrant shrew (Musaraigne errante)	Sorex vagrans (Baird, 1857)	Montane streams	Southern Cordillera	I: LC least concern
Family Talpidae: moles
Star-nosed mole (Condylure étoilé)	Condylura cristata (Linnaeus, 1758)	Wet forest	Manitoba, Ontario, Quebec, Labrador, New Brunswick and Nova Scotia	I: LC least concern
Coast mole (Taupe du Pacifique)	Scapanus orarius (True, 1896)	Alpine coniferous forest	Southwestern British Columbia	I: LC least concern
Townsend's mole (Taupe de Townsend)	Scapanus townsendii (Bachman, 1839)	Fields	Southwestern British Columbia	I: LC least concern; CA: endangered; BC: Red List
Shrew-mole (Taupe de Townsend)	Neurotrichus gibbsii (Baird, 1858)	Banks	Southwestern British Columbia	I: LC least concern
Eastern mole (Taupe à queue glabre)	Scalopus aquaticus (Linnaeus, 1758)	Open woodlands	Point Pelee area	I: LC least concern; CA: special concern
Hairy-tailed mole (Taupe à queue velue)	Parascalops breweri (Bachman, 1842)	Dry loose soils	Southern Quebec and Ontario	I: LC least concern

== Introduced or accidental species ==
A number of wild mammals may be found in Canadian territory without being confirmed natives. Some were voluntarily or involuntarily introduced. These include the house mouse (Mus musculus), and brown and black rats (respectively Rattus norvegicus and R. rattus). Other include escaped animals: the coypu (Myocastor coypus), European rabbit (Oryctolagus cuniculus) and European hare (Lepus europaeus). Both the European fallow deer (Dama dama) and wild boar (Sus scrofa) were introduced for hunting.

Finally, other species are encountered only accidentally, or so rarely in Canadian territory that it is impossible to tell whether they are permanent residents. Most of these species are cetaceans, some generally poorly known: Risso's dolphin (Grampus griseus), the dwarf and pygmy sperm whales (Kogia sima and K. breviceps), Blainville's and True's beaked whale (Mesoplodon densirostris and M. mirus), the false killer whale (Pseudorca crassidens), and the striped dolphin (Stenella coeruleoalba). The big free-tailed and evening bats (respectively Nyctinomops macrotis and Nycticeius humeralis), as well as the New England cottontail (Sylvilagus transitionalis) are found mostly in areas south of the U.S.-Canada frontier, and occasionally in Canada.

=== Extinct, extirpated or reintroduced species ===
Out of three species that have been extirpated in Canada in written history, two have since been reintroduced.

The sea mink (Neogale macrodon) formerly lived in the Maritime Provinces, but became extinct following overhunting and habitat destruction. The only Canadian (and also last known) specimen was captured on Campobello Island, New Brunswick in 1894.

The eastern elk (Cervus canadensis canadensis), a subspecies of the elk or wapiti, was also formerly found in Quebec and Ontario, but was made extinct for much the same reasons as the sea mink.

Eastern cougars (Puma concolor couguar) were also found in the eastern provinces, but became extinct soon after populations in the United States were eradicated.

The black-footed ferret (Mustela nigripes) became extirpated in Canada in 1937. Between the 1950s and 1981, it was suspected to be entirely extinct until a wild population was discovered in 1981 in Wyoming. Subsequent reintroductions into Canada have failed.

The swift fox (Vulpes velox) and sea otter (Enhydra lutris) both were extirpated in Canada in the 1930s, but were successfully reintroduced in the beginning of the 1970s.

== See also ==
- Fauna of Canada
- List of mammals of the United States
- List of mammals of North America
- Lists of mammals by region
- List of prehistoric mammals

== Notes ==
- A Banfield, Mammals of Canada, pp. xiv-xv.
- B National Symbol of Canada Act 1985 R.S.C., c. N-17: "the Beaver (Castor canadensis) is a symbol of the sovereignty of Canada". National Horse of Canada Act 2002 S.C. 2002, c. 11.

== Sources ==
- Banfield, Alexander W. F. (1974). The Mammals of Canada. Toronto: University of Toronto Press. ISBN 0-8020-2137-9.
- Wilson, Don E.; Sue Ruff (1999). The Smithsonian book of North American mammals. Washington: Smithsonian Institution Press. ISBN 1-56098-845-2.
- Prescott, Jacques; Piere Richard (2004). Mammifères du Québec et de l'Est du Canada (in French) (Rev. 2nd ed.). Waterloo, Quebec: Éditions Michel Quintin. ISBN 2-89435-270-0.
- "The IUCN Red List of Threatened Species: Mammals of Canada". IUCN. 2001.
- "Species at Risk". Environment Canada. Archived from the original on 2006-07-06.
- "Wild Species 2000 Search Tool". Canadian Endangered Species Conservation Council.
- "Database of species assessed by COSEWIC". Committee on the Status of Endangered Wildlife in Canada.
- "BC Species and Ecosystems Explorer". British Columbia Ministry of Environment.
- "Species Currently Listed under the Wildlife Act and New Species Assessed by the ESCC". Alberta Sustainable Resource Development. March 22, 2007. Archived from the original on 2009-07-11.
- "Grizzly Bear Conservation Ranking in B.C." British Columbia Environmental Protection & Sustainability.
- "Wild Species at Risk in Saskatchewan". Saskatchewan Environment.
- "Species Listed Under the Manitoba Endangered Species Act". Manitoba Conservation. Archived from the original on 2007-09-30.
- "Species at Risk in Ontario List". Ontario Ministry of Natural Resources. Archived from the original on 2007-05-23.
- "Liste des espèces fauniques menacées ou vulnérables, ou susceptibles d'être désignées menacées ou vulnérables au Québec" (in French). Ministère des Ressources naturelles et de la Faune du Québec. Archived from the original on February 13, 2007.
- "Animals at risk". New Brunswick Department of Natural Resources. Archived from the original on 2007-09-08.
- "NS Endangered Species Act: Legally Listed Species as of 2006". Nova Scotia Department of Natural Resources Wildlife Division. Archived from the original on 2007-10-12.
- "Wildlife at Risk". Newfoundland and Labrador Department of Environment and Conservation. Archived from the original on 2007-04-17.
- "Yukon Species At Risk". Yukon Department of Environment. Archived from the original on 2007-02-18.
- "NWT Species Monitoring Infobase". Northwest Territory Wildlife Division. Archived from the original on 2007-09-29.
