= Yukon deer mouse =

Scientific classification
- Kingdom: Animalia
- Phylum: Chordata
- Class: Mammalia
- Order: Rodentia
- Family: Cricetidae
- Subfamily: Neotominae
- Tribe: Reithrodontomyini
- Genus: Peromyscus
- Species: P. sp.

Binomial name
- Peromyscus sp.

Species of rodent

The Yukon deermouse or Yukon deer mouse is a species of rodent in the family Cricetidae. It is a species of the genus Peromyscus, a closely related group of New World mice often called "deermice". It is endemic to Yukon Territory in Canada. It is a currently unnamed species of deermouse (Peromyscus), related to Peromyscus maniculatus and Peromyscus keeni. The name "Peromyscus arcticus" has been used for it, but it does not apply to this species.

== Taxonomy ==
In 1998, following extensive sampling of deermouse specimens throughout northern British Columbia, central Yukon, and northern southeast Alaska, Melanie Wike identified a unique lineage that did not associate with the western deer mouse (P. sonoriensis) (then thought to be North American deermouse, or P. maniculatus) or northwestern deermouse (P. keeni), both of which also reach the northern limits of their range in the Yukon. Genetic studies in 2007 and 2019 further affirmed that this population represents a distinct species. Some of these authors called the Yukon species "Peromyscus arcticus", but this name in fact applies to a population from Labrador in eastern Canada (within the range of P. maniculatus), and was later applied to a deermouse from Fort Simpson, Northwest Territories (within the range of P. sonoriensis). As such, there is no available name for the Yukon species, and it is provisionally referred to as Peromyscus sp.

== Distribution ==
The species ranges within Yukon from Sulphur Lake southeast to Kluane National Park and Reserve and Annie Lake.
