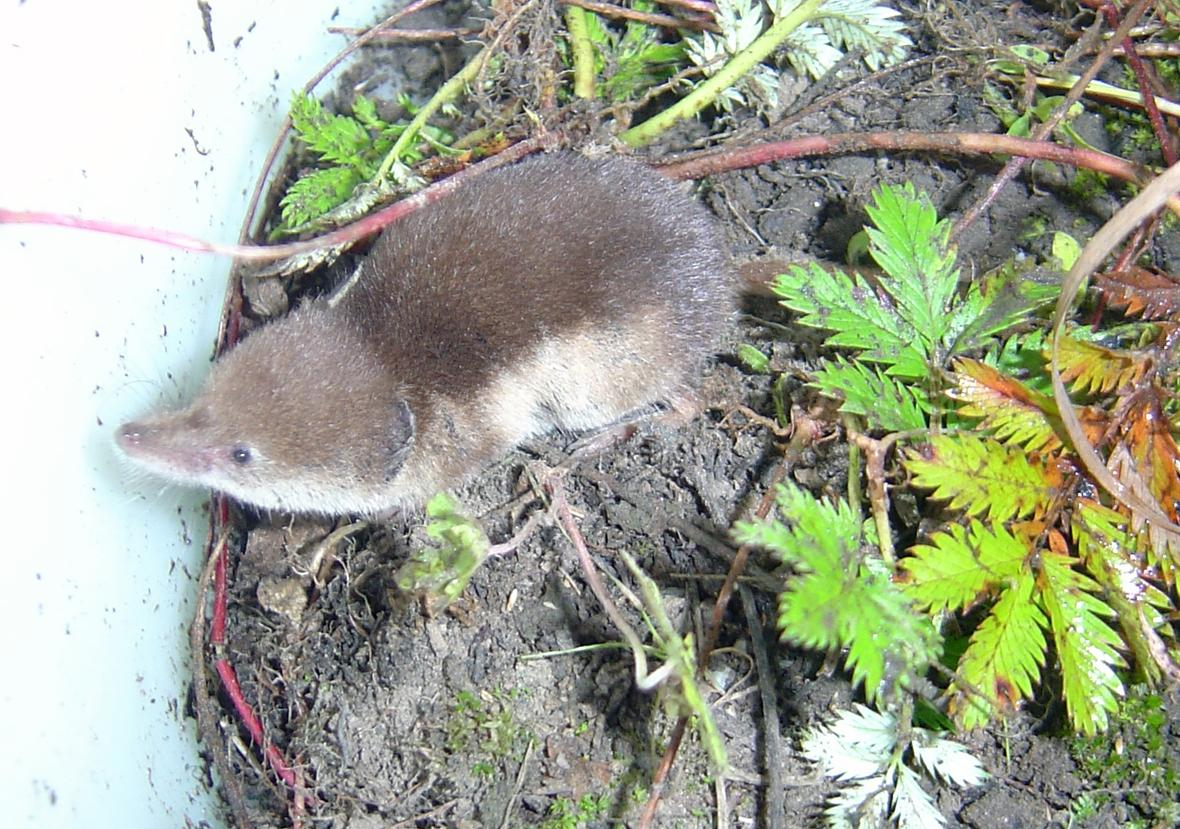

Conservation status
- Least Concern (IUCN 3.1)

Scientific classification
- Kingdom: Animalia
- Phylum: Chordata
- Class: Mammalia
- Order: Eulipotyphla
- Family: Soricidae
- Genus: Sorex
- Species: S. tundrensis

Binomial name
- Sorex tundrensis Merriam, 1900
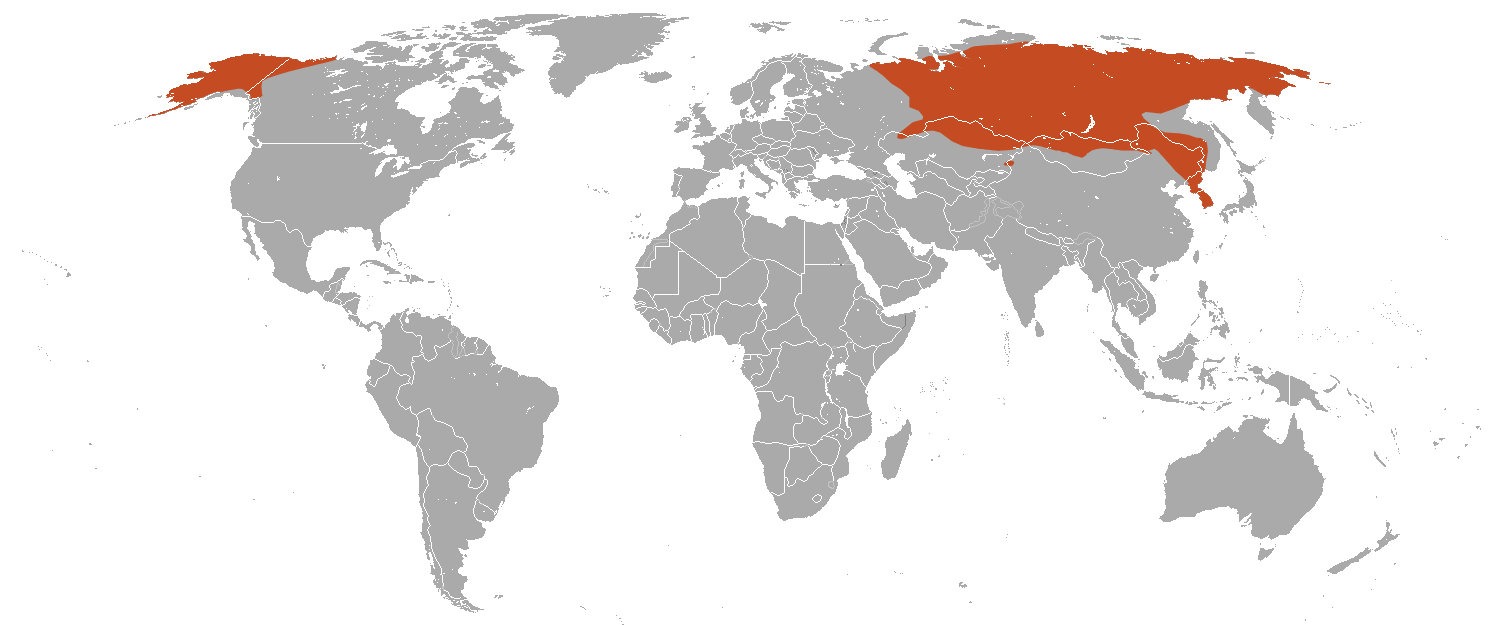
- Tundra shrew range

= Tundra shrew =

Species of mammal

The tundra shrew (Sorex tundrensis) is a small shrew found in Alaska, the northern Yukon Territory, the MacKenzie Delta region of the Northwest Territories, extreme northwestern British Columbia and eastern Russia. At one time, this animal was considered to be a subspecies of the Arctic shrew (Sorex arcticus).

It is dark brown on its back with pale brown sides and grey underparts. Its tail is brown on top and lighter brown below. Its fur grows longer for winter. Its body is about 12 centimetres (4.7 in) in length including a 4 centimetres (1.6 in) long tail. It weighs about 11 grams (0.39 oz).

This animal is found on hillsides with shrubs or grassy vegetation or dry ridges near marshes or bogs. It eats insects, worms and grasses. Predators include hawks and owls. This animal is active day and night year-round, burrowing through the snow in winter. It mates during the spring. 4 to 8 young are born in a nest under a log or in a crevice.
