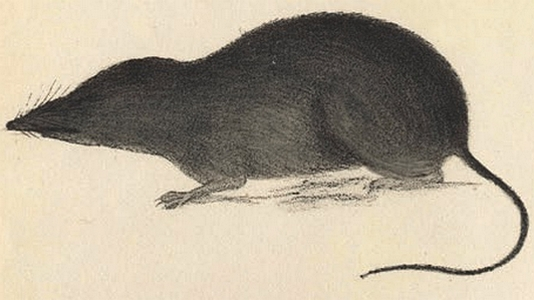

Conservation status
- Least Concern (IUCN 3.1)

Scientific classification
- Kingdom: Animalia
- Phylum: Chordata
- Class: Mammalia
- Order: Eulipotyphla
- Family: Soricidae
- Genus: Sorex
- Species: S. arcticus

Binomial name
- Sorex arcticus Kerr, 1792
- Arctic shrew range

= Arctic shrew =

Species of mammal

The Arctic shrew (Sorex arcticus), also known as the blackback shrew or saddlebacked shrew, is a medium-sized shrew found in Canada and the northern United States. Separate species status has been proposed for the maritime shrew (Sorex maritimensis) which is found in New Brunswick and Nova Scotia and had been considered to be a subspecies of the Arctic shrew. The tundra shrew (Sorex tundrensis) was formerly considered to be a subspecies of the Arctic shrew.

== Physical description ==
The Arctic shrew is most distinctive in its tricolored fur. It is dark brown or black on its back from its head to the base of its tail, while its flanks are a lighter brown, and its underside is lighter still grayish brown. Even its tail is bi-colored, dark brown on the dorsal side, and gradually fading to a lighter brown on the ventral side. The fur is grayer in winter time, and its tricolor is most marked during the winter months from October to June, for the fur is thicker and brighter. Arctic shrews molt twice a year, and the tricolor bands in the fur are less prominent in younger shrews.

Its body length ranges from 10 to 12 cm (3.9 to 4.7 in) including a 4 cm (1.6 in) long tail. Its mass may range from 5 to 13 g (0.18 to 0.46 oz) and it possesses thirty-two teeth with an average metabolism of 4.7 kilocalories a day.

== Distribution and habitat ==
Arctic shrews are native to North America, ranging from the Arctic Circle in the north and as far south as the northern United States, into North and South Dakota, Wisconsin, Michigan, and Minnesota. Their eastern limits are in eastern Quebec and the Atlantic Maritime provinces, and their western limits are the southern Yukon and Mackenzie valleys.

Arctic shrews are found in a variety of habitats in highest density of 3 to 5 individuals per acre and each individual Arctic shrew appears to limit its range to one tenth of an acre. Of their various habitats, they are found in greatest quantity and density in areas near bodies of water, such as lakes, streams, marshes, wetlands, bogs, swamps, ditches or open areas near wetlands. In the Upper Peninsula of Michigan, they are found densely in spruce and tamarack swamps, in addition to other typical habitats. Arctic shrews have been found in clearings in boreal forests, and occasionally in mixed conifer swamps, dry or old fields, dense grasses near ditches, mixed grasses, in the undergrowth of forest clearings, alder thickets, and dry marsh with grasses, hammock sedges, forbs, cattail, willow, and red-osier shrubs.

== Mating and reproduction ==
There is little information about the mating habits of the Arctic shrew, however males of most shrew species mate with many females, and compete with other males for females, so the assumption is that Arctic shrews behave similarly. In Wisconsin, the breeding season lasts from February to August, and the breeding season is shorter in more northern areas, from April to August. Arctic shrew females give birth to one or two litters each year, and these litters range in size from 4 to 10 offspring, with an average of 7 offspring per litter. The gestation period ranges between 13 and 21 days, so the young stay with their mother until 5 to 6.5 weeks after conception, and males make no contribution to parental care. When they are born, young Arctic shrews are helpless. Their mother cares for them until the end of the weaning period, 20 to 24 days after birth. Both female and male Arctic shrews reach sexual maturity after one year. As much as 50 percent of all juveniles die in the first month, but the average lifespan of an Arctic shrew in the wild is around 18 months.

== Behaviour ==
Arctic shrews are solitary animals. Adults are territorial. In one laboratory study, whenever two Arctic shrews were placed together in a cage, one was dead within several days, though there was no sign of injury to the dead shrew. Arctic shrews are active during day and night, though there are contradicting reports on levels and cycles of activity throughout the day. One claim is that they are least active during mid-morning, while other reports describe alternating periods of activity and rest, with an average of fourteen periods of activity daily. Arctic shrews are very active and move quickly. Periods of inactivity are spent lying on the ground, either on one side or with the ventral side down, body rolled up, and head tucked under the body. Grooming consists of wiping the forefeet rapidly along the mouth.

Like all shrews, the Arctic shrew has a voracious and insatiable appetite due to its quick metabolism. It eats insects, worms and small invertebrates, with a large proportion of its diet made up of larch sawflies, though Arctic shrews in captivity have been fed dead voles, fly pupae, and mealworms. The only known predators of Arctic shrews are great horned owls.

== Subspecies ==
There are two subspecies recognized for this species:

- Sorex arcticus arcticus
- Sorex arcticus laricorum
