= Northwestern deer mouse =

Conservation status
- Least Concern (IUCN 3.1)

- Secure (NatureServe)

Scientific classification
- Kingdom: Animalia
- Phylum: Chordata
- Class: Mammalia
- Order: Rodentia
- Family: Cricetidae
- Subfamily: Neotominae
- Genus: Peromyscus
- Species: P. keeni

Binomial name
- Peromyscus keeni (Rhoads, 1894)

Synonyms
- oreas Bangs, 1898 sitkensis Merriam, 1897

Species of rodent

The northwestern deer mouse, northwestern deermouse, or Keen's mouse (Peromyscus keeni) is a species of rodent in the family Cricetidae. It is a species of the genus Peromyscus, a closely related group of New World mice often called "deermice".

== Distribution ==
It is found in British Columbia in Canada and in Alaska and Washington in the United States.

== History ==
It was named after John Henry Keen in 1894.

== Mode of nutrition ==
This type of rodent consumes and scatters seeds that are present in black bear scats. They also hoard seeds to store for winter survival.
