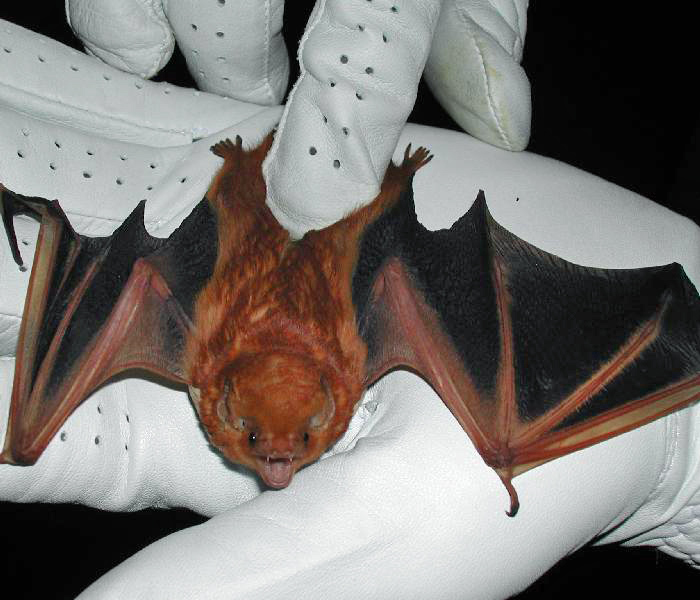
- Eastern red bat (Lasiurus borealis)

Scientific classification
- Kingdom: Animalia
- Phylum: Chordata
- Class: Mammalia
- Infraclass: Placentalia
- Order: Chiroptera
- Family: Vespertilionidae
- Subfamily: Vespertilioninae
- Tribe: Lasiurini; Tate, 1942

Genera
- Aeorestes; Dasypterus; Lasiurus

= Lasiurini =

Tribe of vesper bats

Lasiurini is a tribe of bats in the family Vespertilionidae. It contains three genera of bats found in the Americas. All three genera were previously considered one genus, Lasiurus, but have since been split from one another. However, as of 2021, the validity of this split was still debated and, as of 2026 it has not yet been accepted by either the Mammal Diversity Database or the Batnames database.

== Species ==
Species in the tribe include:

- Genus Aeorestes – hoary bats
  - Hoary bat, Aeorestes cinereus
  - Big red bat, Aeorestes egregius
  - Hawaiian hoary bat, Aeorestes semotus
  - South American hoary bat, Aeorestes villosissimus
- Genus Dasypterus – yellow bats
  - Southern yellow bat, Dasypterus ega
  - Cuban yellow bat, Dasypterus insularis
  - Northern yellow bat, Dasypterus intermedius
  - Western yellow bat, Dasypterus xanthinus
- Genus Lasiurus – red or hairy-tailed bats
  - Arequipa red bat, Lasiurus arequipae
  - Greater red bat, Lasiurus atratus
  - Southern red bat, Lasiurus blossevillii
  - Eastern red bat, Lasiurus borealis
  - Tacarcuna bat, Lasiurus castaneus
  - Jamaican red bat, Lasiurus degelidus
  - Hairy-tailed bat, Lasiurus ebenus
  - Western red bat, Lasiurus frantzii
  - Minor red bat, Lasiurus minor
  - Pfeiffer's red bat, Lasiurus pfeifferi
  - Seminole bat, Lasiurus seminolus
  - Cinnamon red bat, Lasiurus varius
