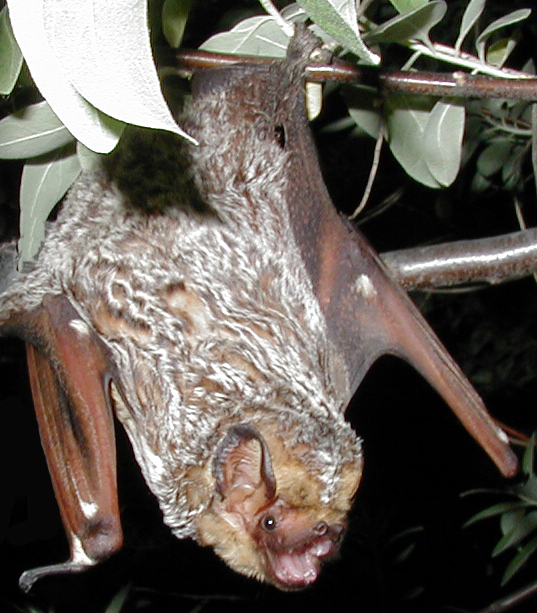
- The hoary bat, Aeorestes cinereus

Scientific classification
- Kingdom: Animalia
- Phylum: Chordata
- Class: Mammalia
- Order: Chiroptera
- Family: Vespertilionidae
- Genus: Lasiurus
- Subgenus: Aeorestes; Fitzinger, 1870

Type species
- Lasiurus (Aeorestes) villosissimus

Species
- See text

= Aeorestes =

Genus of bats

Aeorestes is a subgenus of Lasiurus commonly known as the hoary bats.

== Taxonomy ==
- M. lucifugus (outgroup)
- Lasiurini
  - Dasypterus
    - D. xanthinus
    - - D. ega
      - - D. insularis
        - D. intermedius
  - - Aeorestes
      - A. egregius
      - - A. villosissimus
        - - A. semotus
          - A. cinereus
    - Lasiurus
      - - L. blossevillii
        - L. frantzii
      - - L. borealis
        - - L. pfeifferi
          - L. seminolus

Relationship of the three genera formerly included within Lasiurus, based on an analysis of nuclear and mitochondrial DNA.

The subgenus was initially described by Austrian zoologist Leopold Fitzinger in 1870. Based on genetic divergence within Lasiurus, Baird et al. recommended that the hoary bats be recognized as a separate genus. They additionally recommended that Dasypterus should be elevated from a subgenus to a genus as well. However, as Lasiurus was previously monophyletic, some authors see the creation of two new genera—Aeorestes and Dasypterus—as a solution to something that was not a problem. Teta advocated using Aeorestes as a subgenus and retaining the usage of Dasypterus as such.

In a 2017 follow-up to their 2015 study, Baird et al. again expressed that Aeorestes, Dasypterus, and Lasiurus should be separate genera comprising the tribe Lasiurini. They stated that the genetic distance of the three genera was much greater than observed between other bat genera, on average. In contrast to the average of 12.0% inter-generic divergence reported from another study on bats, Aeorestes and Dasypterus varied 18.79%; Aeorestes and Lasiurus varied 19.05%; and Dasypterus and Lasiurus varied 19.79%.

Aeorestes split from Lasiurus approximately 17.99 Ma (million years ago). A. villosissimus diverged from the hoary bat and the Hawaiian hoary bat approximately 4.61 Ma, while the latter two species split from each other 1.35 Ma.

== Species ==
Based on Baird et al., Aeorestes contains the following members:

- Hoary bat (Lasiurus cinereus)
- Big red bat (Lasiurus egregius)
- Hawaiian hoary bat (Lasiurus semotus)
- South American hoary bat (Lasiurus villosissimus)
