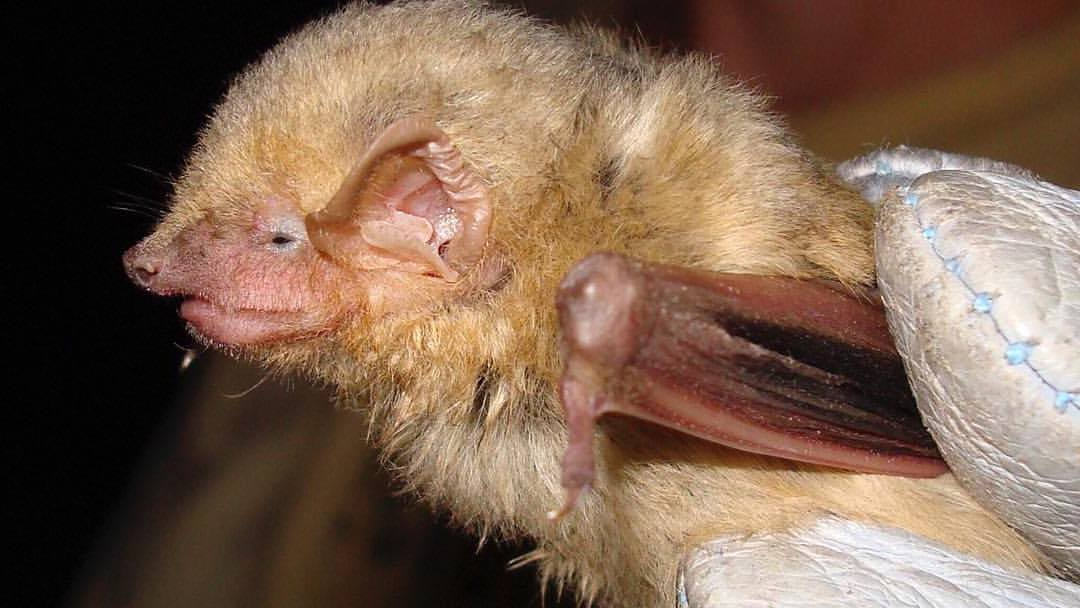
- Dasypterus xanthinus

Scientific classification
- Kingdom: Animalia
- Phylum: Chordata
- Class: Mammalia
- Order: Chiroptera
- Family: Vespertilionidae
- Genus: Lasiurus
- Subgenus: Dasypterus; Peters, 1870

Species
- See text

= Dasypterus =

Genus of bats

Dasypterus is a subgenus of Lasiurus. Collectively, members of Lasiurus (Dasypterus) are referred to as the yellow bats.

== Taxonomy ==
- M. lucifugus (outgroup)
- Lasiurini
  - Dasypterus
    - D. xanthinus
    - - D. ega
      - - D. insularis
        - D. intermedius
  - - Aeorestes
      - A. egregius
      - - A. villosissimus
        - - A. semotus
          - A. cinereus
    - Lasiurus
      - - L. blossevillii
        - L. frantzii
      - - L. borealis
        - - L. pfeifferi
          - L. seminolus

Relationship of the three genera formerly included within Lasiurus, based on an analysis of nuclear and mitochondrial DNA.

Based on genetic divergence within Lasiurus, Baird et al. recommended that the hoary bats be recognized as a separate genus, Aeorestes. They additionally recommended that Dasypterus should be elevated from a subgenus to a genus as well. However, as Lasiurus was previously monophyletic, some authors see the creation of two new genera—Aeorestes and Dasypterus—as a solution to something that was not a problem. Teta advocated using Aeorestes as a subgenus and retaining the usage of Dasypterus as such.

In a 2017 follow-up to their 2015 study, Baird et al. again expressed that Aeorestes, Dasypterus, and Lasiurus should be separate genera comprising the tribe Lasiurini. They stated that the genetic distance of the three genera was much greater than observed between other bat genera, on average. In contrast to the average of 12.0% inter-generic divergence reported from another study on bats, Aeorestes and Dasypterus varied 18.79%; Aeorestes and Lasiurus varied 19.05%; and Dasypterus and Lasiurus varied 19.79%.

=== Species ===
The subgenus consists of the following four species:

- Southern yellow bat (Lasiurus ega)
- Cuban yellow bat (Lasiurus insularis)
- Northern yellow bat (Lasiurus intermedius)
- Western yellow bat (Lasiurus xanthinus)
