= List of mammals of South Carolina =

This is a list of mammals that are or were historically native to the US state of South Carolina.

Balaenopteridae

- Minke whale (Balaenoptera acutorostrata)
- Sei whale (Balaenoptera borealis)
- Bowhead whale (Balaena mysticetus)
- Fin whale (Balaenoptera physalus)
- Right whale (Eubalaena glacialis)
- Humpback whale (Megaptera novaengliae)

Bovidae

- American bison (Bison bison) extirpated

Canidae

- Coyote (Canis latrans)
- Red wolf (Canis rufus) extirpated
- Gray fox (Urocyon cinereoargenteus)
- Red fox (Vulpes vulpes)

Cervidae

- Elk (Cervus canadensis) vagrant
  - Eastern elk (C. c. canadensis) EX
  - Rocky Mountain elk (C. c. nelsoni) introduced, vagrant
- White-tailed deer (Odocoileus virginianus)

Dasypodidae

- Nine-banded armadillo (Dasypus novemcinctus)

Delphinidae

- Saddleback dolphin (Delphinus delphis)
- Short-finned pilot whale (Globicephala macrohyncha)
- Atlantic pilot whale (Globicephala melaena)
- Grampus (Grampus griseus)
- Dense-beaked whale (Mesoplodon densirostris)
- Antillean beaked whale (Mesoplodon europaeus)
- True's beaked whale (Mesoplodon mirus)
- False killer whale (Pseudorca crassidens)
- Pantropical spotted dolphin (Stenella attenuata)
- Striped dolphin (Stenella coeruleoalba)
- Atlantic spotted dolphin (Stenella frontails)
- Spinner dolphin (Stenella longirostris)
- Rough-toothed dolphin (Steno bredanensis)
- Common bottlenose dolphin (Tursiops truncatus)

Didelphimorphia

- Virginia opossum (Didelphis virginiana)

Felidae

- Bobcat (Lynx rufus)
- Cougar (Puma concolor) extirpated
  - Eastern cougar, (P. c. couguar) EX

Leporidae

- Swamp rabbit (Sylvilagus aquaticus)
- Eastern cottontail (Sylvilagus floridanus)
- Marsh rabbit (Sylvilagus palustris)
- Snowshoe hare (Lepus americanus) extirpated

Mephitidae

- Striped skunk (Mephitis mephitis)
- Spotted skunk (Spilogale putorius)

Molossidae

- Brazilian free-tailed bat (Tadarida brasiliensis)

Muridae

- House mouse (Mus musculus) introduced
- Meadow vole (Microtus pennsylvanicus)
- Pine vole (Microtus pinetorum)
- Southern red-backed vole (Myodes gapperi)
- Eastern woodrat (Neotoma floridana)
- Golden mouse (Ochrotomys nuttalli)
- Muskrat (Ondatra zibethiscus)
- Marsh rice rat (Oryzomys palustris)
- Cotton mouse (Peromyscus gossypinus)
- White-footed mouse (Peromyscus leucopus)
- Deer mouse (Peromyscus maniculatus)
- Oldfield mouse (Peromyscus polionotus)
- Black rat (Rattus rattus) introduced
- Norway rat (Rattus norvegicus) introduced
- Eastern harvest mouse (Reithrodontomys humulis)
- Hispid cotton rat (Sigmodon hispidus)

Mustelidae

- North American river otter (Lontra canadensis)
- Least weasel (Mustela nivalis)
- Long-tailed weasel (Neogale frenata)
- American mink (Neogale vison)

Phocidae

- Harbor seal (Phoca vitulina)

Phocoenidae

- Harbor porpoise (Phocoena phocoena)

' Kogiidae

- Pygmy sperm whale (Kogia breviceps)
- Dwarf sperm whale (Kogia simus)

Physeteridae

- Sperm whale (Physeter macrocephalus)

Procyonidae

- Raccoon (Procyon lotor)

Sciuridae

- Southern flying squirrel (Glaucomys volans)
- Groundhog (Marmota monax)
- Gray squirrel (Sciurus carolinensis)
- Fox squirrel (Sciurus niger)
- Eastern chipmunk (Tamias striatus)
- American red squirrel (Tamiasciurus hudsonicus)

Soricidae

- Northern short-tailed shrew (Blarina brevicauda)
- Southern short-tailed shrew (Blarina carolinensis)
- Least shrew (Cryptotis parva)
- Masked shrew (Sorex cinereus)
- Smoky shrew (Sorex fumeus)
- American pygmy shrew (Sorex hoyi)
- Southeastern shrew (Sorex longirostris)

Suidae

- Wild boar (Sus scrofa) introduced

Talpidae

- Star-nosed mole (Condylura cristata)
- Hairy-tailed mole (Parascalops breweri)
- Eastern mole (Scalopus aquaticus)

Trichechidae

- West Indian manatee (Trichechus manatus)

Ursidae

- Black bear (Ursus americanus)

Vespertilionidae

- Big brown bat (Eptesicus fuscus)
- Silver-haired bat (Lasionycteris noctivagans)
- Eastern red bat (Lasiurus borealis)
- Hoary bat (Lasiurus cinereus)
- Northern yellow bat (Lasiurus intermedius)
- Seminole bat (Lasiurus seminolus)
- Southeastern myotis (Myotis austroriparius)
- Eastern small-footed bat (Myotis leibii)
- Little brown bat (Myotis lucifugus)
- Northern long-eared bat (Myotis septentrionalis)
- Indiana bat (Myotis sodalis)
- Evening bat (Nycticeius humeralis)
- Tricolored bat (Perimyotis subflavus)
- Eastern pipistrelle (Pipistrellus subflavus)
- Rafinesque's big-eared bat (Plecotus rafinesqueii)

Zapodidae

- Woodland jumping mouse (Napaeozapus insignis)
- Meadow jumping mouse (Zapus hudsonius)

Ziphiidae

- Goosebeaked whale (Ziphius carvirostris)
