= Minor red bat =

Conservation status
- Vulnerable (IUCN 3.1)

Scientific classification
- Domain: Eukaryota
- Kingdom: Animalia
- Phylum: Chordata
- Class: Mammalia
- Order: Chiroptera
- Family: Vespertilionidae
- Genus: Lasiurus
- Species: L. minor

Binomial name
- Lasiurus minor Miller, 1931

Species of bat

The minor red bat (Lasiurus minor) is a species of bat from the family Vespertilioninae. It is found in the Bahamas, Hispaniola (both the Dominican Republic and Haiti), and Puerto Rico in the Caribbean, though there are only six known individuals in the latter.

== Diet and behaviour ==
The minor red bat is a solitary, insectivorous species that forages in open areas and rests among the leaves of trees. It is a swift flier, though it is not highly maneuverable.

== Conservation ==
Hurricanes, habitat destruction, and human population growth are several factors leading to a decreasing population trend, and the minor red bat is listed as vulnerable by the IUCN Red List due to ongoing population reduction and a small geographic range.

== See also ==
- Desert red bat
- Eastern red bat
- Seminole bat
