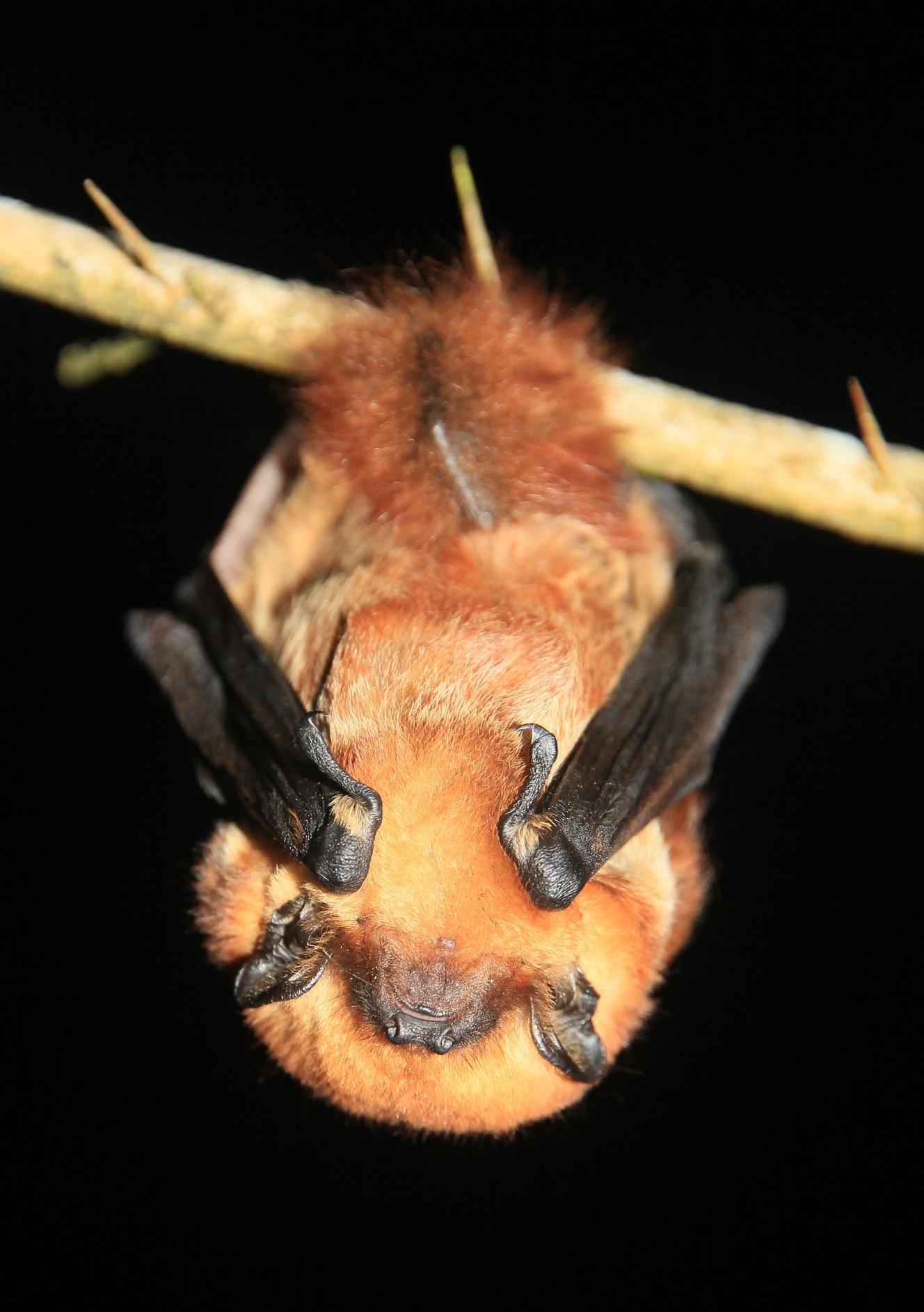

Conservation status
- Least Concern (IUCN 3.1)

Scientific classification
- Kingdom: Animalia
- Phylum: Chordata
- Class: Mammalia
- Order: Chiroptera
- Family: Vespertilionidae
- Genus: Lasiurus
- Species: L. varius

Binomial name
- Lasiurus varius (Poeppig, 1835)
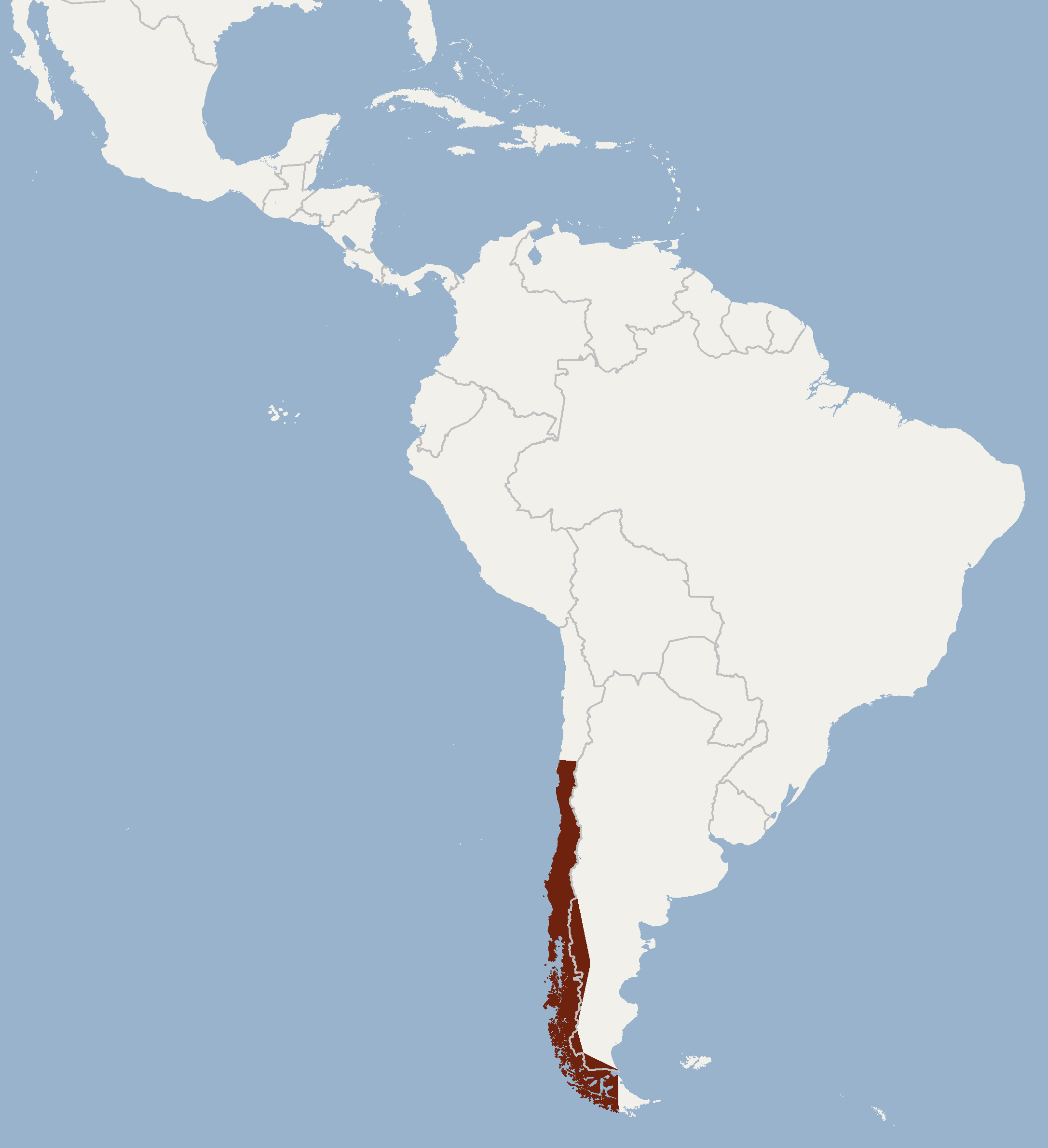
- Distribution of the Cinnamon red bat (1992)

Synonyms
- Nycticeius varius Poeppig, 1835; Nycticeus poepingii (Lesson, 1836); Atalpha varia (Poeppig, 1835); Atalapha noveboracensi (Dobson, 1878)

= Cinnamon red bat =

Species of bat

The cinnamon red bat (Lasiurus varius) is a species of bat in the family Vespertilionidae. It was first described from a specimen that had been collected in Chile. For more than one hundred years after its initial description, it was largely considered a synonym of the eastern red bat (Lasiurus borealis). From the 1980s onward, it was frequently recognized as distinct from the eastern red bat due to its fur coloration and differences in range. It has deep red fur, lacking white "frosting" on the tips of individual hairs seen in other members of Lasiurus. It has a forearm length of 39–42 mm (1.5–1.7 in) and a weight of 9.5–11.0 g (0.34–0.39 oz).

As in all members of its genus, females have four teats. Little is known about its reproduction, though females may give birth in winter to an average litter of two young. The young are born with their eyes closed, opening them by two weeks of age. Individuals roost solitarily or in small family groups. It is insectivorous, foraging for prey like moths and beetles using echolocation. Its echolocation calls consist of three types: search, approach, and final buzz. It is found only in South America in Chile and Argentina, and has one of the southernmost ranges of any bats. Little is known about its population size, but it is presumably large due to its large geographic range. Threats are unknown, but could include development of wind energy.

== Taxonomy ==
The cinnamon red bat was described as a new species in 1835 by German zoologist Eduard Friedrich Poeppig, who placed it in the genus Nycticeius with the scientific name Nycticeius varius. The holotype had been collected in Antuco, Chile. The first usage of its current name combination of Lasiurus varius was in 1870 by Leopold Fitzinger. Other names that have been applied to this taxon include Nycticeus poepingii, Atalpha varia, and Atalapha noveboracensi. A variety of authors in the 1800s and 1900s considered L. varius as a synonym of the eastern red bat (L. borealis). The eastern red bat was thus thought to have a very large range, from Canada south to Tierra del Fuego. Several taxa have since been segregated from the eastern red bat, included the cinnamon red bat, saline red bat (L. salinae), and desert red bat (L. blossevillii).

Beginning in the 1980s, the cinnamon red bat was more frequently recognized as distinct from the eastern red bat due to its unique fur coloration and restricted range. Genetic analysis in 2015 further confirmed they were significantly different. Based on a mitochondrial gene, the cinnamon red bat is the sister taxon to a clade containing the eastern red bat, Pfeiffer's red bat, and Seminole bat. It does not have any subspecies.

== Description ==
The cinnamon red bat has a forearm length of 39–42 mm (1.5–1.7 in) and a total length of 105–118 mm (4.1–4.6 in). Individuals weigh 9.5–11.0 g (0.34–0.39 oz). The wings are long and narrow, with black membranes. It can be distinguished from other species in Lasiurus by its deep red fur coloration and lack of white "frosting" on the tips of individual hairs. Additionally, its uropatagium (tail membrane) is densely furred, with hairs extending past the edge of the membrane. The hairs of its back are tricolored, with black bases, yellowish middles, and vibrant, cinnamon-red tips. It has yellowish shoulder patches, a black snout, and pale, yellowish-orange coloration of its forehead and neck. Individual hairs on its belly are also tricolored, though the black bases extend much further along the hair, making the yellow band much narrower than on its back hairs.

== Biology and ecology ==
Like all members of Lasiurus, the cinnamon red bat has four teats. This is unusual, as most female bats only have one pair of teats. Its breeding season is not well-studied, but several pregnant females have been documented in November and a juvenile was once captured at the end of February. Females have a typical litter size of two young. Newborns in Lasiurus are born with their eyes closed; eyes open at 10–12 days old. It is a solitary species, though individuals may roost in small family groups.

It is insectivorous, consuming prey such as moths and beetles. It has a fast flight with low maneuverability, and may take advantage of human development to hunt insects drawn to street lights. While foraging, it uses three types of echolocation calls common to insectivorous bats: search, approach, and final buzz. As it searches for insects, it uses single-harmonic calls. The beginning of search-phase calls is frequency-modulated, followed by a near-constant frequency component. These search calls have long durations and frequencies ranging from 52 – 33 kHz. Approach-phase calls are similar to search-phase calls, though occur closer together. The final feeding buzz consists of steep, downward frequency-modulated calls. Echolocation characteristics are influenced by environmental clutter. In more cluttered environments, the cinnamon red bat emits shorter search-phase calls closer together, whereas in less cluttered environments, search-phase calls are longer and further apart.

== Range and habitat ==
The cinnamon red bat is one of the southernmost bats in South America, occurring in southern Argentina and central and southern Chile. In Chile it is associated with sclerophyllous forests in Central Chile and the Valdivian temperate rain forest near the coast. In Argentina, it occurs in Patagonian temperate rainforests, and has been recorded in the provinces of Chubut, Neuquén, and Río Negro. It probably occurs in Tierra del Fuego, the islands off the southernmost tip of continental South America, but the only published record of the cinnamon red bat in that region was in 1902. It is sympatric with only one other member of Lasiurus, the desert red bat. During the day, it roosts in the foliage of trees, though occasionally some have been documented roosting on rocks.

== Conservation ==
There is no information about its population size, but due to its large distribution it is presumed to have a large population and is therefore considered a least-concern species. Specific threats to the species are unknown, though it could be negatively impacted by the ongoing development of wind energy. Regionally, it is evaluated as least concern in Chile and as data deficient in Argentina.
