= Red bat =

Red bat may refer to:

- Eastern red bat (Lasiurus borealis), a species of bat found in the Eastern United States
- Western red bat (Lasiurus blossevillii), a species of bat found in Western United States, also called the "Desert red bat"
- The Red Bat, a cartoon character
