= L. poeppigii =

L. poeppigii may refer to:

- Lacistema poeppigii, a flowering plant
- Lagothrix poeppigii, a woolly monkey
- Lankesterella poeppigii, a parasite that infects amphibians
- Lasiurus poeppigii, a hairy-tailed bat
- Leptopus poeppigii, a flowering plant
