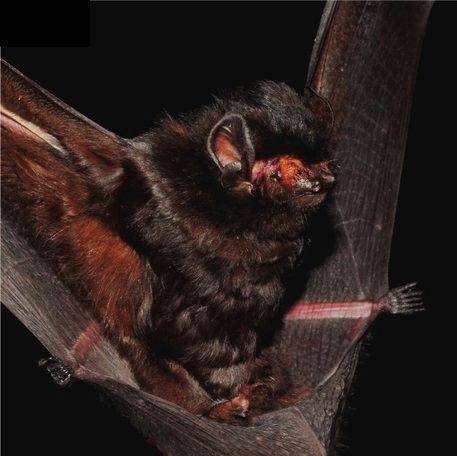

Conservation status
- Data Deficient (IUCN 3.1)

Scientific classification
- Kingdom: Animalia
- Phylum: Chordata
- Class: Mammalia
- Order: Chiroptera
- Family: Vespertilionidae
- Genus: Lasiurus
- Species: L. ebenus

Binomial name
- Lasiurus ebenus Fazzolari-Correa, 1994

= Hairy-tailed bat =

Species of bat

The hairy-tailed bat (Lasiurus ebenus), is a bat species originally known only from its type locality, Ilha do Cardoso State Park in Brazil. A second specimen was collected in 2018, in Carlos Botelho State Park, approximately 100 kilometers away.
