= Baird Ornithological Club =

United States ornithological club

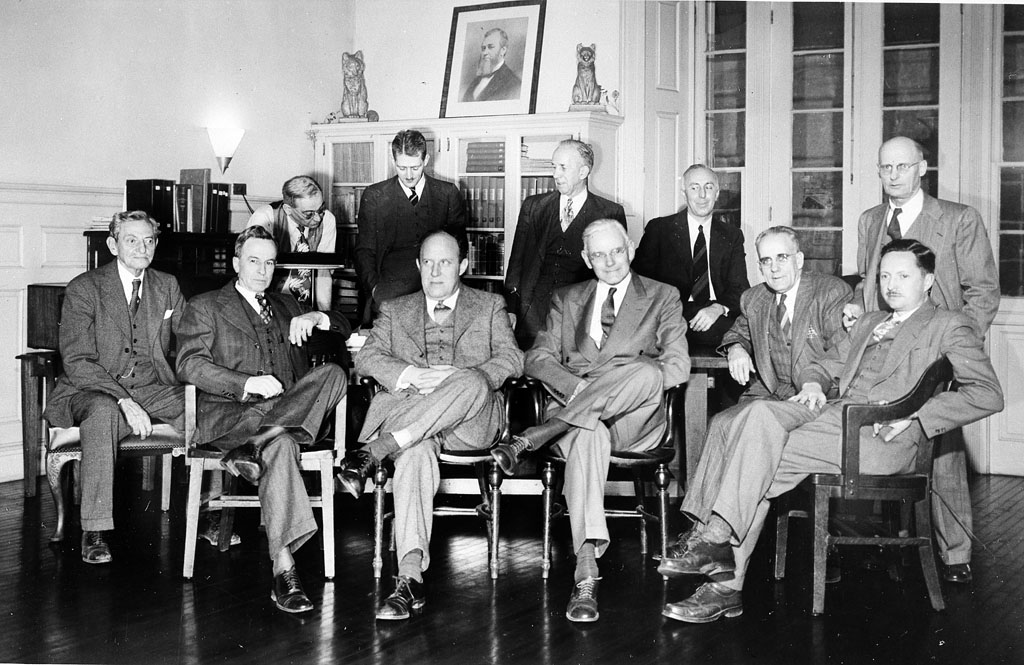
108th meeting of the Baird Ornithological Club in Holt House, the original administration building of the National Zoological Park, on January 14, 1948

The Baird Ornithological Club is a United States ornithological club. Founded in 1921, the club seeks to advance the field of ornithology and foster relationships between fellow ornithologists. The organization was named after Spencer Fullerton Baird. The organization was founded by Earl Lincoln Poole and Harold Morris in Berks County, Pennsylvania.

The organization is located in Reading, Pennsylvania, the birthplace of Baird. The clubs efforts focus specifically on the birdlife of Berks County. They also had a club in Washington, D.C., which was founded in 1922 and is now defunct.

Ornithologists who were members include Edward Alphonso Goldman, Ned Hollister, Arthur H. Howell, Edward William Nelson, Harry Church Oberholser, Theodore Sherman Palmer, Edward Alexander Preble, Charles Wallace Richmond, Leonhard Stejneger, and Alexander Wetmore.
