= Jamaican red bat =

Conservation status
- Vulnerable (IUCN 3.1)

Scientific classification
- Kingdom: Animalia
- Phylum: Chordata
- Class: Mammalia
- Order: Chiroptera
- Family: Vespertilionidae
- Genus: Lasiurus
- Species: L. degelidus

Binomial name
- Lasiurus degelidus Miller, 1931

Species of mammal in Jamaica

The Jamaican red bat (Lasiurus degelidus) is a species of vesper bat. It is endemic to Jamaica.

This is one of the least well-known species of bats in Jamaica. No specimens have been recorded from within caves or near caves so this appears to be a tree-roosting bat. It is caught over water.
