= Cuban yellow bat =

Conservation status
- Vulnerable (IUCN 3.1)]

Scientific classification
- Kingdom: Animalia
- Phylum: Chordata
- Class: Mammalia
- Order: Chiroptera
- Family: Vespertilionidae
- Genus: Lasiurus
- Species: L. insularis

Binomial name
- Lasiurus insularis (Hall & Jones, 1961)

Species of bat

The Cuban yellow bat (Lasiurus insularis) is a species of bat from the family Vespertilioninae. It was previously included as a subspecies of the northern yellow bat, a species that has a similar ecology and biology. The species is endemic to Cuba, specifically the Las Villas Province in Cienfuegos, and it is listed under the IUCN Red List as vulnerable due to its ongoing population reduction and relatively small geographic range.

== Taxonomy ==
The Cuban yellow bat was described as a new species in 1961 by E. R. Hall and J. K. Jones. They determined it was a subspecies of the northern yellow bat and gave it a trinomen of Lasiurus intermedius insularis, while expressing belief that it might actually be a full species. The holotype had been collected in 1948 in Cienfuegos, Cuba by D. Gonzáles Muñoz.

A 1976 publication suggested that the Cuban yellow bat should be considered a full species, which was corroborated by a genetic study in 1995 that found it was distinct from other yellow bats. Within Lasiurus, it is part of the subgenus Dasypterus.

== Description ==
It is the largest vesper bat in Cuba, with individuals weighing 20–30 g (0.71–1.06 oz); its forearm length is 57–64 mm (2.2–2.5 in). It is covered in long, dense yellow fur.

== Biology and ecology ==
Its predators include owls, as a Cuban yellow bat skull was once found in an owl pellet. During the day it roosts in the foliage of fan-leaved palms such those in the genus Thrinax. It is insectivorous, feeding on beetles, flies, and true bugs.

== Range and habitat ==
The Cuban yellow bat is endemic to Cuba, where it has a patchy distribution and has been rarely documented. It is associated with forest habitat.
