= Tacarcuna bat =

Conservation status
- Data Deficient (IUCN 3.1)

Scientific classification
- Kingdom: Animalia
- Phylum: Chordata
- Class: Mammalia
- Order: Chiroptera
- Family: Vespertilionidae
- Genus: Lasiurus
- Species: L. castaneus

Binomial name
- Lasiurus castaneus Handley, 1960

Species of bat

The Tacarcuna bat (Lasiurus castaneus) is a species of vesper bat. It is found in Costa Rica, Panama and possibly Colombia.
