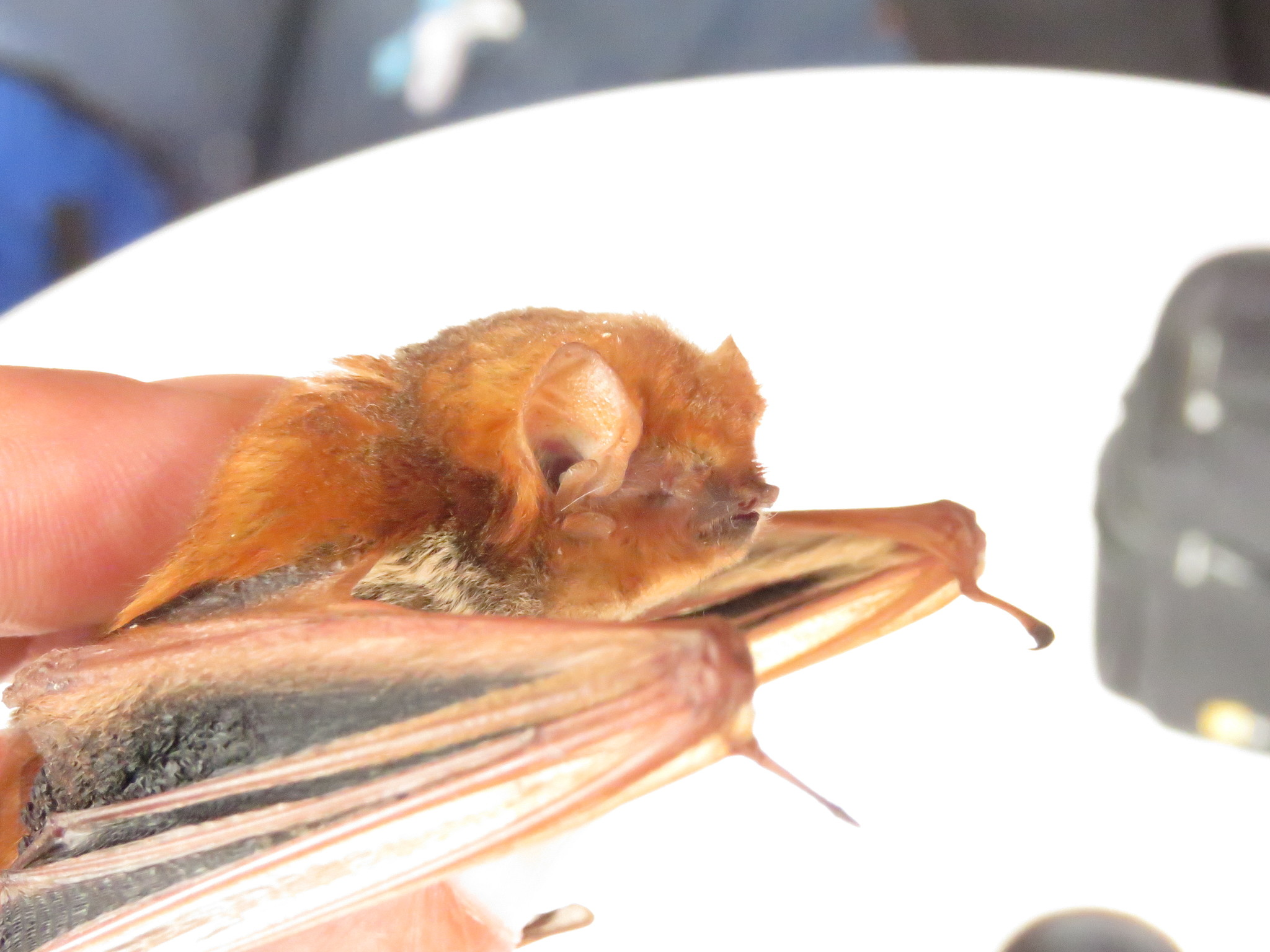

Conservation status
- Least Concern (IUCN 3.1) (includes frantzii)

Scientific classification
- Kingdom: Animalia
- Phylum: Chordata
- Class: Mammalia
- Order: Chiroptera
- Family: Vespertilionidae
- Genus: Lasiurus
- Species: L. blossevillii

Binomial name
- Lasiurus blossevillii (Lesson and Garnot, 1826)
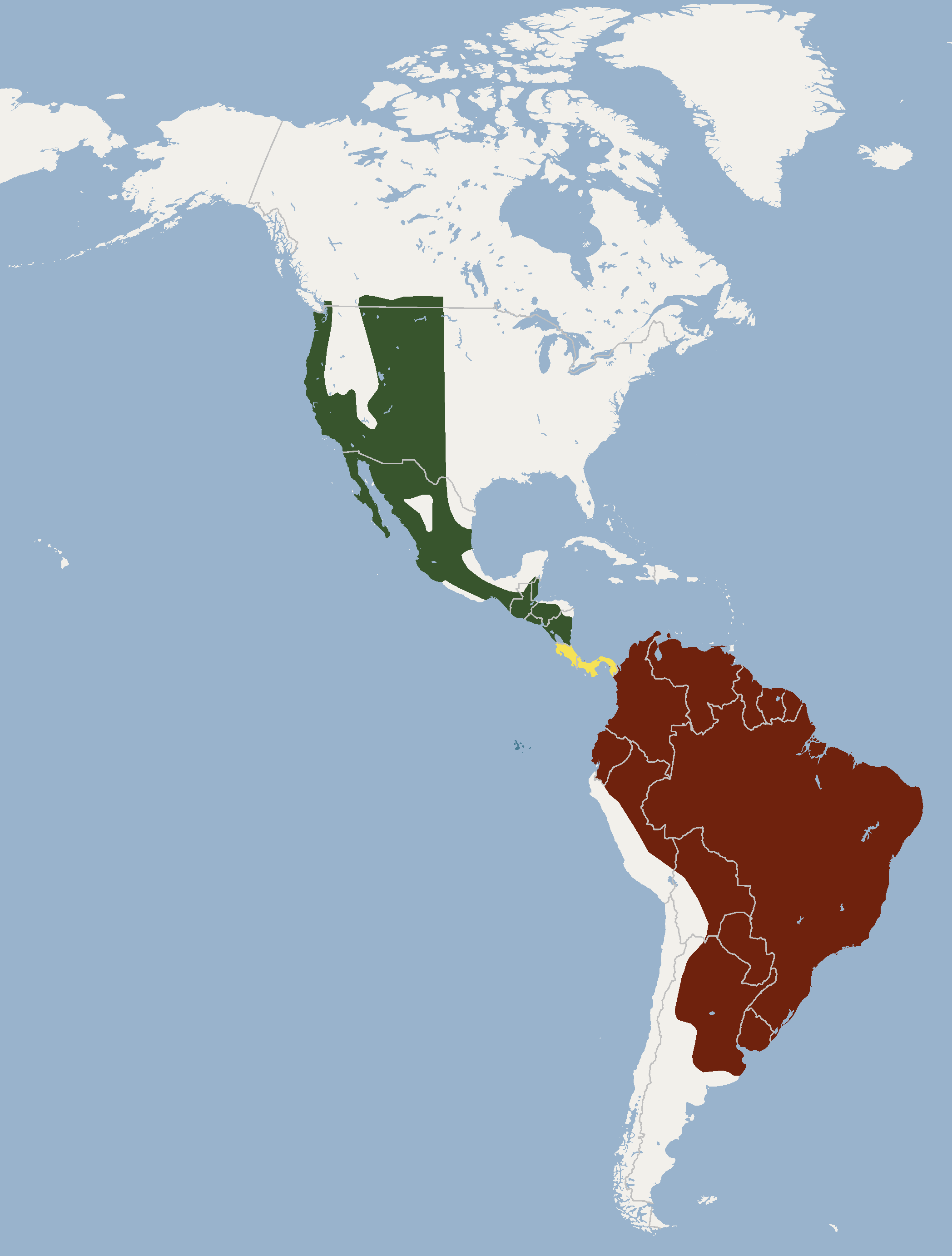
- Southern red bat range in red

= Southern red bat =

Species of bat

The southern red bat (Lasiurus blossevillii) is a species of microbat found in South America.

== Taxonomy ==
Previously, the western red bat (L. frantzii) was classified as a subspecies of the southern red bat, but phylogenetic evidence supports it being a distinct species. This has been followed by the American Society of Mammalogists and the ITIS.

It was named after French explorer Jules de Blosseville.

== Distribution ==
The species is recorded in Argentina, Bolivia, Brazil, Colombia, Ecuador (Galápagos Islands), French Guiana, Guyana, Paraguay, Peru, Suriname, Trinidad and Tobago, Uruguay and Venezuela.

== See also ==
- Eastern red bat – Lasiurus borealis
- Western red bat – previously considered a subspecies of Lasiurus blossevillii
- Bats of the United States
