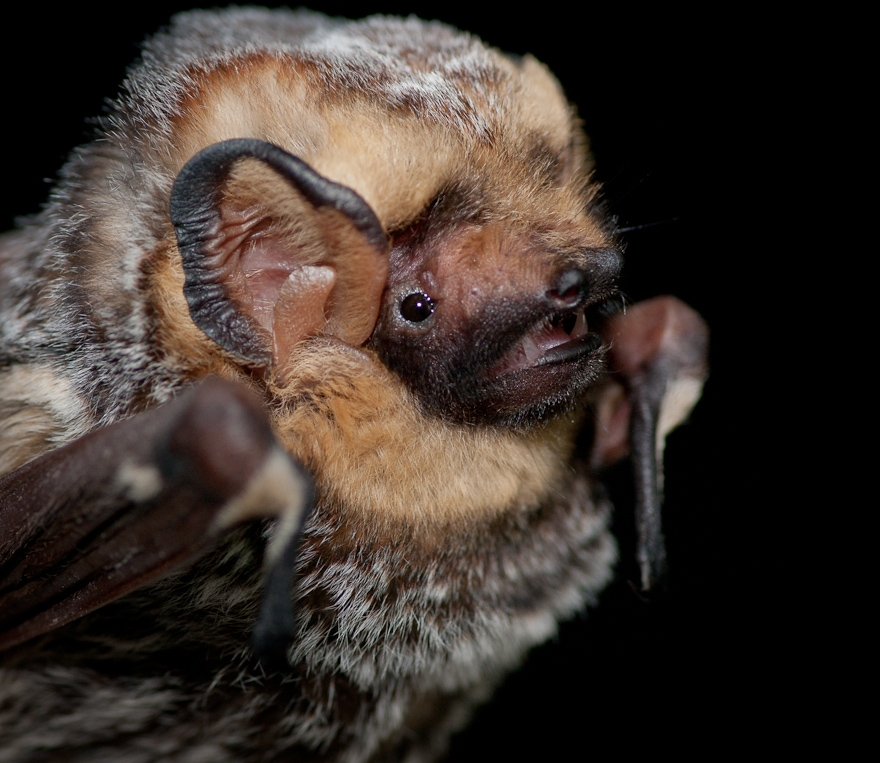
- Hoary bat (Lasiurus cinereus)

Scientific classification
- Kingdom: Animalia
- Phylum: Chordata
- Class: Mammalia
- Infraclass: Placentalia
- Order: Chiroptera
- Family: Vespertilionidae
- Tribe: Lasiurini
- Genus: Lasiurus; Gray, 1831

Type species
- Vespertilio borealis (Müller, 1776)

Species
- 20, see text.

= Lasiurus =

Hairy-tailed bats

Genus of bats

Lasiurus is a genus of bats in the family Vespertilionidae. Its members are known as hairy-tailed bats or red bats.

== Phylogeny ==
The following is the relationship of the three genera formerly included within Lasiurus, based on an analysis of nuclear and mitochondrial DNA.

- M. lucifugus (outgroup)
- Lasiurini
  - Dasypterus
    - D. xanthinus
    - - D. ega
      - - D. insularis
        - D. intermedius
  - - Aeorestes
      - A. egregius
      - - A. villosissimus
        - - A. semotus
          - A. cinereus
    - Lasiurus
      - - L. blossevillii
        - L. frantzii
      - - L. borealis
        - - L. pfeifferi
          - L. seminolus

== Species ==
The following are the described species in Lasiurus:

- Lasiurus arequipae Málaga, Díaz, Arias & Medina, 2020 — Arequipa cinnamon red bat
- Lasiurus atratus (Handley, 1996) — greater red bat
- Southern red bat (Lasiurus blossevillii)
- Eastern red bat (Lasiurus borealis)
- Tacarcuna bat (Lasiurus castaneus)
- Hoary bat (Lasiurus cinereus)
- Jamaican red bat (Lasiurus degelidus)
- Hairy-tailed bat (Lasiurus ebenus)
- Southern yellow bat (Lasiurus ega)
- Big red bat (Lasiurus egregius)
- Western red bat (Lasiurus frantzii)
- Cuban yellow bat (Lasiurus insularis)
- Northern yellow bat (Lasiurus intermedius)
- Minor red bat (Lasiurus minor)
- Pfeiffer's red bat (Lasiurus pfeifferi)
- Seminole bat (Lasiurus seminolus)
- Hawaiian hoary bat (Lasiurus semotus)
- Cinnamon red bat (Lasiurus varius)
- South American hoary bat (Lasiurus villosissimus)
- Western yellow bat (Lasiurus xanthinus)
