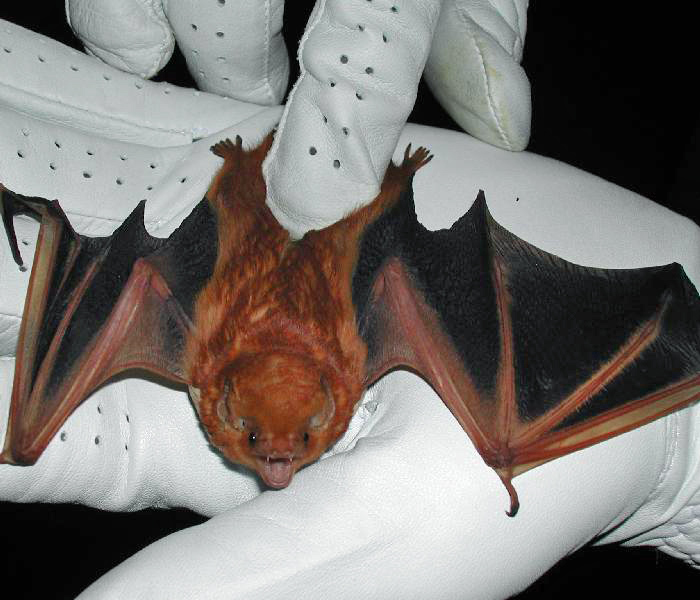

Conservation status
- Least Concern (IUCN 3.1)

Scientific classification
- Kingdom: Animalia
- Phylum: Chordata
- Class: Mammalia
- Order: Chiroptera
- Family: Vespertilionidae
- Genus: Lasiurus
- Species: L. borealis

Binomial name
- Lasiurus borealis Müller, 1776
- Range (note: map erroneously shows the species to be present in Cuba.)

Synonyms
- Vespertilio borealis Müller, 1776; Vespertilio noveboracensis Erxleben, 1777; Vespertilio lasiurus Schreber, 1781; Vespertilio rubellus Palisot de Beauvois, 1796; Vespertilio rubra Ord, 1815; Vespertilio tesselatus Rafinesque, 1818; Vespertilio monachus Rafinesque, 1818; Vespertilio rufus Warden, 1820; Lasiurus funebris Fitzinger, 1870; Myotis quebecensis Yourans, 1930

= Eastern red bat =

Species of bat

The eastern red bat (Lasiurus borealis) is a species of microbat in the family Vespertilionidae. Eastern red bats are widespread across eastern North America, with additional records in Bermuda.

== Taxonomy and etymology ==
- Lasiurini
  - Dasypterus
  - - Aeorestes
    - - - L. blossevillii
        - L. frantzii
      - - L. borealis
        - - L. pfeifferi
          - L. seminolus

Relationship of L. borealis within Lasiurus, based on an analysis of nuclear and mitochondrial DNA.

It was described in 1776 by German zoologist Philipp Ludwig Statius Müller. He initially placed it in the genus Vespertilio, (Note: When first described in 1758, Vespertilio was equivalent to the modern taxonomic order Chiroptera.) with the name Vespertilio borealis. It was not placed into its current genus Lasiurus until the creation of the genus in 1831 by John Edward Gray. The generic name "Lasiurus" is derived from the Greek lasios ("hairy") and oura ("tail"); its species name "borealis" is Latin in origin, meaning "northern." Of the species in its genus, the eastern red bat is most closely related to other red bats, with which they form a monophyly. Its closest relatives are the Pfeiffer's red bat (Lasiurus pfeifferi), Seminole bat (L. seminolus), cinnamon red bat (L. varius), desert red bat (L. blossevillii), saline red bat (L. salinae), and the greater red bat (L. atratus).

== Description ==
The eastern red bat has distinctive fur, with males being brick or rusty red, and females being a slightly more frosted shade of red. Both male and female eastern red bats have distinctive shoulder patches of white fur. Individual hairs on its back are approximately 5.8 mm (0.23 in), while hairs on its uropatagium are 2.6 mm (0.10 in) long. Fur on its ventral surface is usually lighter in color. Its entire body is densely furred, including its uropatagium. It is a medium-sized member of its genus, weighing 7–13 g (0.25–0.46 oz) and measuring 109 mm (4.3 in) from head to tail. Its ears are short and rounded, with triangular tragi. Its wings are long and pointed. Its tail is long, at 52.7 mm (2.07 in) long. Its forearm is approximately 40.6 mm (1.60 in) long. Its dental formula is 1.1.2.33.1.2.3, for a total of 32 teeth.

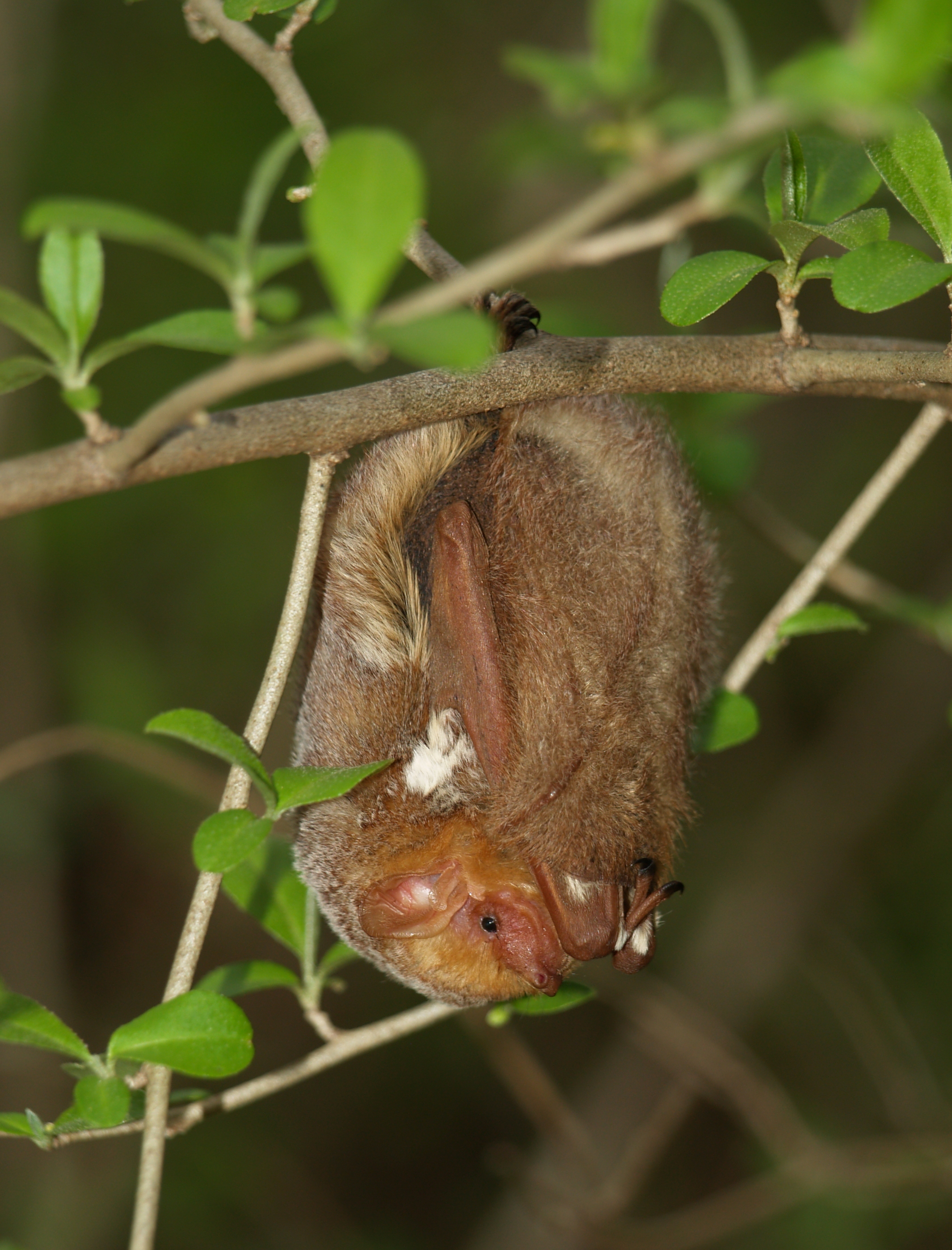
Female eastern red bat, roosting in a tree

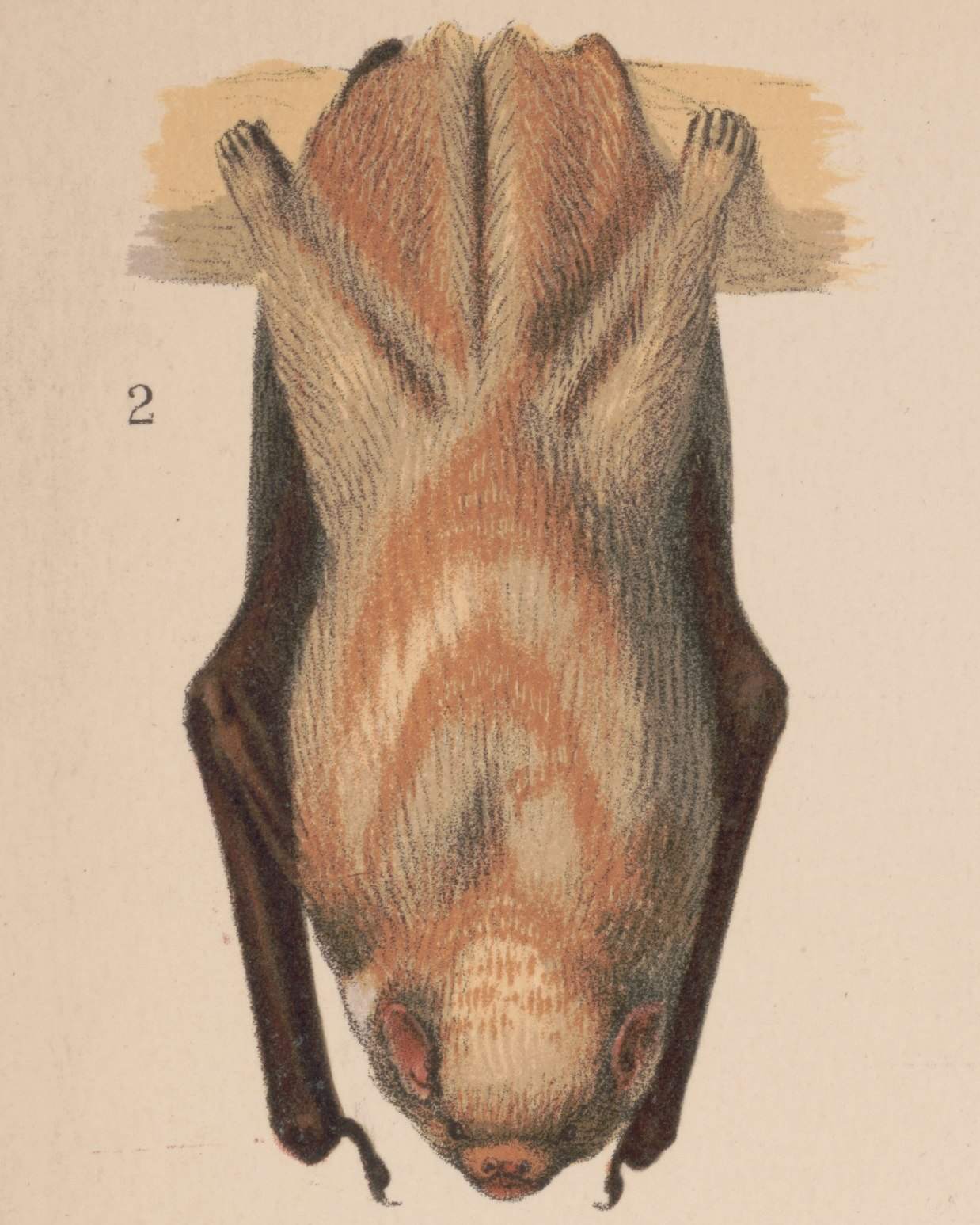
In 1874 art

== Biology and ecology ==
The aspect ratio and wing loading of eastern red bat wings indicates that they fly relatively quickly and are moderately maneuverable. Eastern red bats are insectivorous, preying heavily on moths, with other insect taxa also consumed. They consume known pests, including gypsy moths, tent caterpillar moths, Cydia moths, Acrobasis moths, cutworm moths, and coneworm moths.

=== Reproduction and life expectancy ===
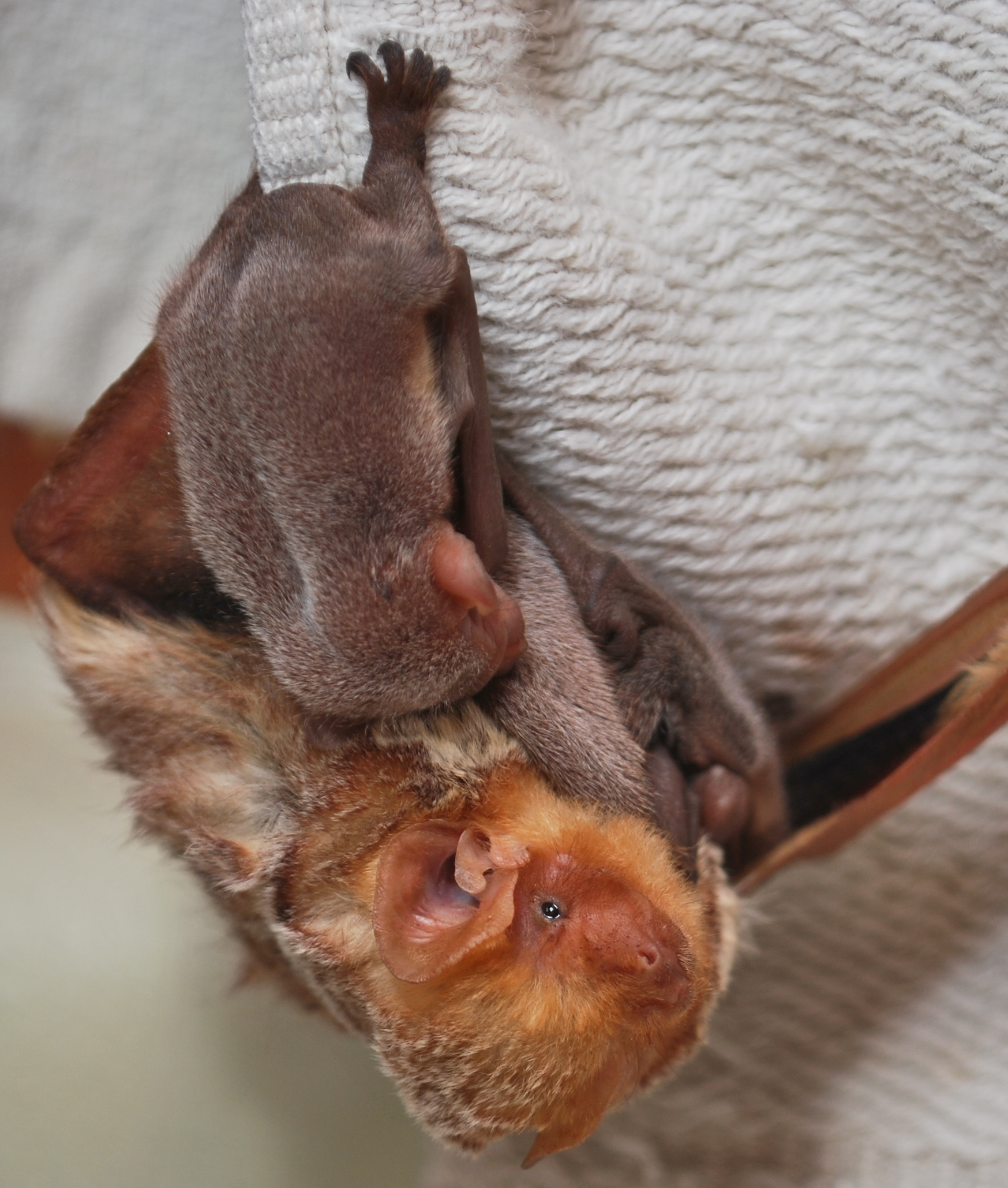
Female with three pups.

Eastern red bat breeding season starts in the autumn, and multiple males can sire a single litter. Pups are born in the summer, usually sometime between May and July. Unlike other bats species who usually produce one pup, eastern red bats have on average three pups at a time, and some eastern red bats have given birth to as many as five pups. Females have four nipples, which allows them to nourish multiple offspring at once. Eastern red bat pups learn to fly about a month after being born, after which they are weaned. Even after the pups have learned how to fly, they remain with their mother for a while before roosting on their own.

Eastern red bats are often attacked and killed by hawks and owls, or aggressive species like blue jays and crows; the former animal in particular serves as a major predator for bats hiding in leaf piles. Eastern red bats are also killed by flying into cars, tall human-made structures, or wind turbines. Allen Kurta argues that the lifespan for an eastern red bat is about two years, although they can probably live even longer.

== Range and habitat ==
The eastern red bat is widely distributed in eastern North America and Bermuda. It generally occurs east of the Continental Divide, including southern Canada and northeastern Mexico. In the winter, it occurs in the southeastern United States and northeastern Mexico, with greatest concentrations in coastal areas. In the spring and summer, it can be found in the Great Lakes region and the Great Plains region. Unlike the closely related hoary bat, males and females have the same geographic range throughout the year. Formerly, some authors included the western United States, Central America, and the northern part of South America in its range, but these populations have since been reassigned to the desert red bat, Lasiurus blossevillii.

== Conservation ==
The eastern red bat is evaluated as least concern by the IUCN, the lowest-priority conservation category. It meets the criteria for this designation because it has a wide geographic range, large population size, it occurs in protected areas, it tolerates some habitat disturbance, and its population size is unlikely to be declining rapidly.

Eastern red bats and other migratory tree bats are vulnerable to death by wind turbines via barotrauma. The eastern red bat has the second-greatest mortality from wind turbines, with hoary bats most affected.

While eastern red bats have been documented carrying the spores of Pseudogymnoascus destructans, the fungus that causes white-nose syndrome, no individuals have been observed with clinical symptoms of the disease.

== See also ==
- Bats of Canada
- Bats of the United States
