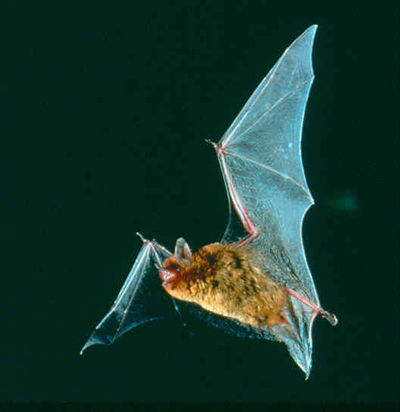

Conservation status
- Least Concern (IUCN 3.1)

Scientific classification
- Kingdom: Animalia
- Phylum: Chordata
- Class: Mammalia
- Order: Chiroptera
- Family: Vespertilionidae
- Genus: Myotis
- Species: M. austroriparius

Binomial name
- Myotis austroriparius (Rhoads, 1897)
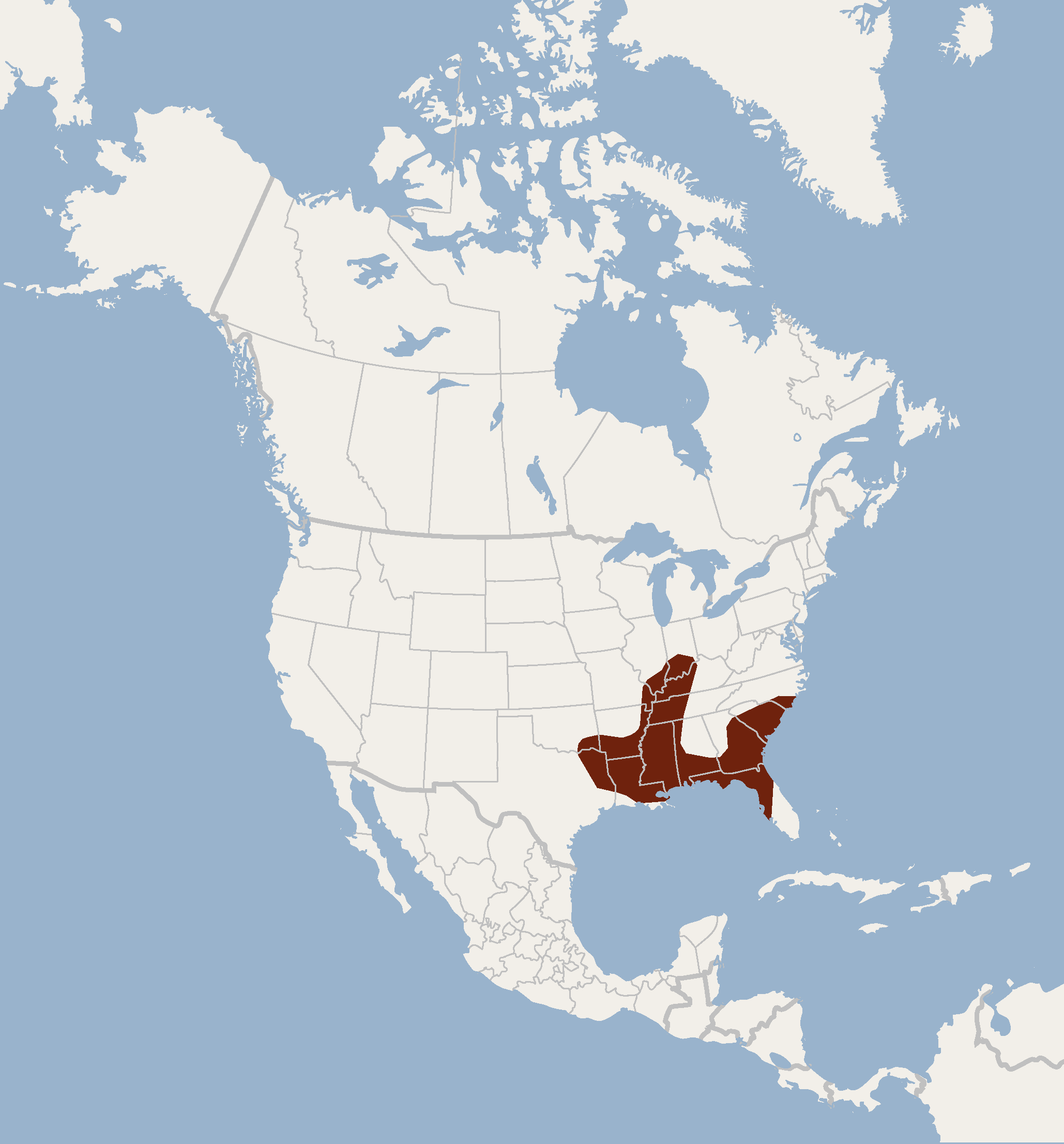
- Distribution of the southeastern bat (1989)

= Southeastern myotis =

Species of bat

The southeastern myotis (Myotis austroriparius) is a small bat found throughout the Gulf Coastal Plain and the Lower Mississippi Alluvial Plain of the southeastern United States.

== Description ==
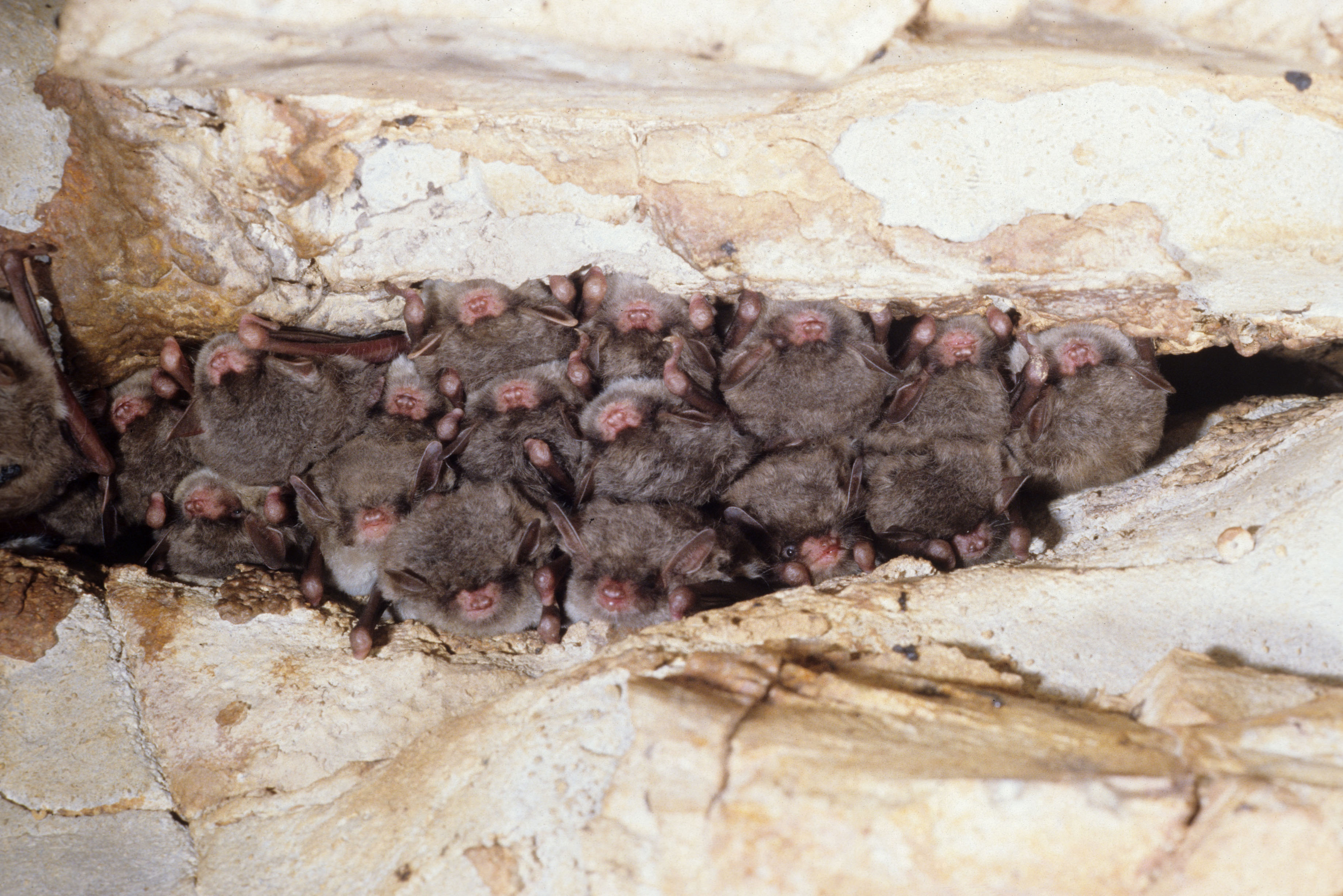
Hibernating southeastern myotis

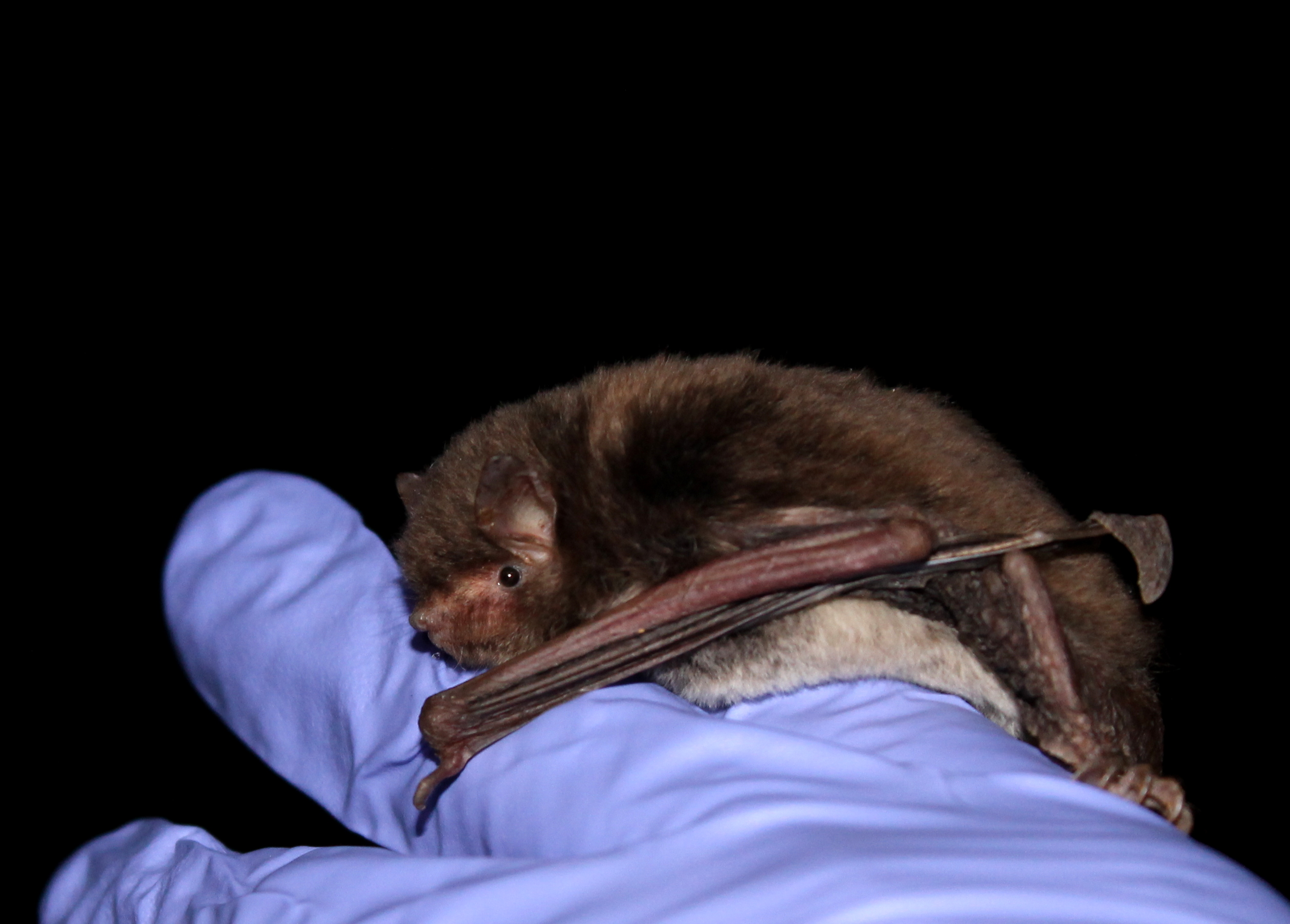
Photo of Myotis austroriparius captured in early April while harp trapping a cave

The southeastern myotis weighs 5–8 g. Its diet consists predominantly of insects. All species of the genus Myotis, including the southeastern bat, rest by day and forage at night. They often hunt and feed over water. The feeding flights usually alternate with periods of rest, during which the bats hang to digest their catch. The southeastern bat has a wingspan of about 9-11 inches. Pelage varies from gray to bright orange-brown, with females generally being more brightly colored than the males. Southeastern bats are unique among Myotis of the United States in the production of twins; all other Myotis females usually produce one baby.

This species is occasionally observed roosting with Rafinesque's big-eared bats.

== Range ==
The range of this species includes southern Illinois and Indiana in the north, westward into southeastern Oklahoma, western Tennessee and Arkansas, and northeastern Texas, and eastward to the southern part of North Carolina. Disjunct populations of this species occur in the Ohio River Valley of Kentucky, and the majority of the population lives in the northern half of the peninsula of Florida

== Ecology ==
Southeastern myotis are an important food source for barred owls, particularly in the nesting season. They are less important as a food source outside of the nesting season.

== Diet ==
The diet of the southeastern myotis diverges from many other Myotis species by lacking high diet diversity. Their diet diversity index of 3.26 is derived from a diet consisting of 59.0% trichopterans. This species was observed consuming few arachnids and coleopterans. Their diet is most similar to eastern pipistrelle than any other species of Myotis in their consumption of caddisflies.

== Habitat associations ==
Bottomland hardwood forests are facets of southeastern myotis ecology. This species roosts and forages near water. Bottomland hardwood forests typically contain bald cypress and water tupelo which are common roosting trees of bottomland bats. Suitable habitats consist of trees of sufficient size and maturity sufficient for tree cavities to form. There is a positive correlation between captures of this species with percent oaks and a negative correlation with percent bald cypress. A direct relationship for this species exists with increased captures in younger forests of high stem density, low canopy height, and increasing ground cover. They are also known to roost in caves, cisterns, abandoned buildings, and under bridges. The southeastern myotis shows preference for roost trees with the smallest DBH values available and tend to roost in densely packed clusters at cavity apexes.

== Conservation ==
The southeastern myotis is currently listed (informally) by the U.S. Fish and Wildlife Service as a species of management concern. This species is associated with bottomland hardwood forests. This habitat type has suffered a loss of land cover with the estimation of only 15-25% of pre-colonial forested wetlands remaining in the southeastern United States. This species lives in a different forest system than species known as benefitting from forest harvests or thinning. Selectively logging non-cavity trees may leave roost trees, but it could potentially cause alternative disturbances to this species. Some habitats are impacted by nearby areas with extensive agricultural development from lack of sufficient buffering. Flood pulses common to bottomland ecosystems could potentially impact the species. These inundations can cause drowning of maternity colonies or reduced availability of prey by disrupting larval insects.
