= Earl Lincoln Poole =

American artist (1891–1972)

Earl Lincoln Poole (1891–1972) was an American wildlife artist, sculptor, author, and naturalist. He was born on October 30, 1891, in Haddonfield, New Jersey.

Published versions of his illustrations appeared in Birds of Virginia (1913) and Bird Studies at Old Cape May (1937).

After completing high school, Poole attended the Pennsylvania Academy of the Fine Arts and was a Jessup Scholar at the Philadelphia Academy of Natural Sciences. He undertook teaching duties at the Reading Boy's High School in 1915, guided by Levi Mengel, director of the Reading Public Museum at the time, and was subsequently promoted to director of art education.

In 1920, Poole was transferred to the Reading Public Museum, though he still served as Supervisor of Art at Reading Boy's High School until 1930, and was named assistant director of the museum in 1925 and director in 1938. His papers are held at Drexel University in Philadelphia.

Poole was also the founder of the Baird Ornithological Club and helped to establish the Hawk Mountain Sanctuary.

Berks Nature, a nonprofit land trust, has a 30+ acre preserve named after Earl Poole in Alsace Township, Pennsylvania
