= Lasiurus atratus =

Conservation status
- Least Concern (IUCN 3.1)

Scientific classification
- Kingdom: Animalia
- Phylum: Chordata
- Class: Mammalia
- Order: Chiroptera
- Family: Vespertilionidae
- Genus: Lasiurus
- Species: L. atratus

Binomial name
- Lasiurus atratus Handley, 1996

Species of bat

Lasiurus atratus, the greater red bat, is a species of vesper bat. It is found in Guyana, Venezuela, French Guiana and Suriname.
