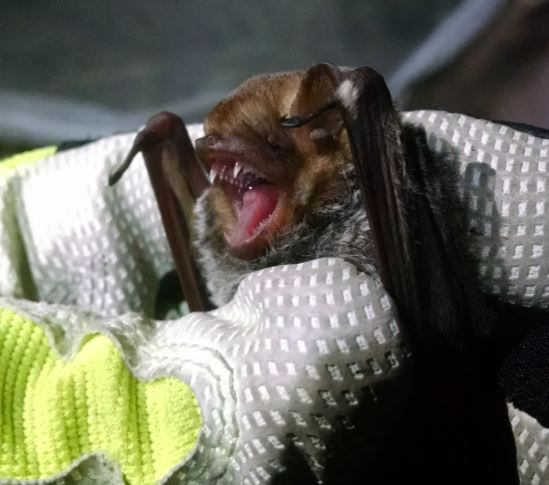

Conservation status
- Least Concern (IUCN 3.1)

Scientific classification
- Kingdom: Animalia
- Phylum: Chordata
- Class: Mammalia
- Order: Chiroptera
- Family: Vespertilionidae
- Genus: Lasiurus
- Species: L. seminolus

Binomial name
- Lasiurus seminolus (Rhoads, 1895)

= Seminole bat =

Species of bat

The Seminole bat (Lasiurus seminolus) is a species of bat in the family Vespertilionidae.

== Taxonomy ==
- Lasiurini
  - Dasypterus
  - - Aeorestes
    - - - L. blossevillii
        - L. frantzii
      - - L. borealis
        - - L. pfeifferi
          - L. seminolus

Relationship of L. seminolus within Lasiurus, based on an analysis of nuclear and mitochondrial DNA.

The Seminole bat was first described in 1895 by Samuel N. Rhoads. The holotype had been collected in Tarpon Springs, Florida in 1892 by William S. Dickinson. Rhoads placed it in the now-defunct genus Atalpha, identifying it as a subspecies of the eastern red bat with a scientific name of Atalpha borealis seminolus. In 1932, the name Lasiurus seminolus was applied to the taxon for the first time by Earl Lincoln Poole.

== Description ==
The Seminole bat is often confused with the red bat. This is due to the coloring of the Seminole bat, which is a mahogany color with a frosted look due to white tipped dorsal hairs. Coloring is not sexually dimorphic, meaning that males and females are similar in color. Average weight is around 12 grams with females being larger than males.

== Diet ==
Seminole bats are insectivores. Insectivores are animals that feed primarily on insects. They have been found to eat relatively large amount of Hymenoptera (ants, bees and wasps), Coleoptera (beetles), Lepidoptera (moths). They have also been shown to eat smaller amounts of Homoptera (cicadas) and Diptera (flies).

== Distribution ==
The Seminole bat is found in the Southeastern United States. This includes Louisiana, Georgia, Alabama, Mississippi, South Carolina and parts of Texas, Tennessee, Arkansas and North Carolina. There are also records of Seminole bats as far as Mexico. It is a migratory species, living along the Gulf Coast, in the Carolinas, and southern Arkansas during the winter. In the summer, they migrate as far north as Missouri and Kentucky.

In 2015, it was documented for the first time in northwestern North Carolina.

The bats prefer to live in forested areas. In winter months they are found to use leaf litter and Spanish moss as insulation in their roost sites. Spanish moss is also thought to be an important factor in Seminole bat environments year round and is believed to be a limiting factor in distribution of these bats.
