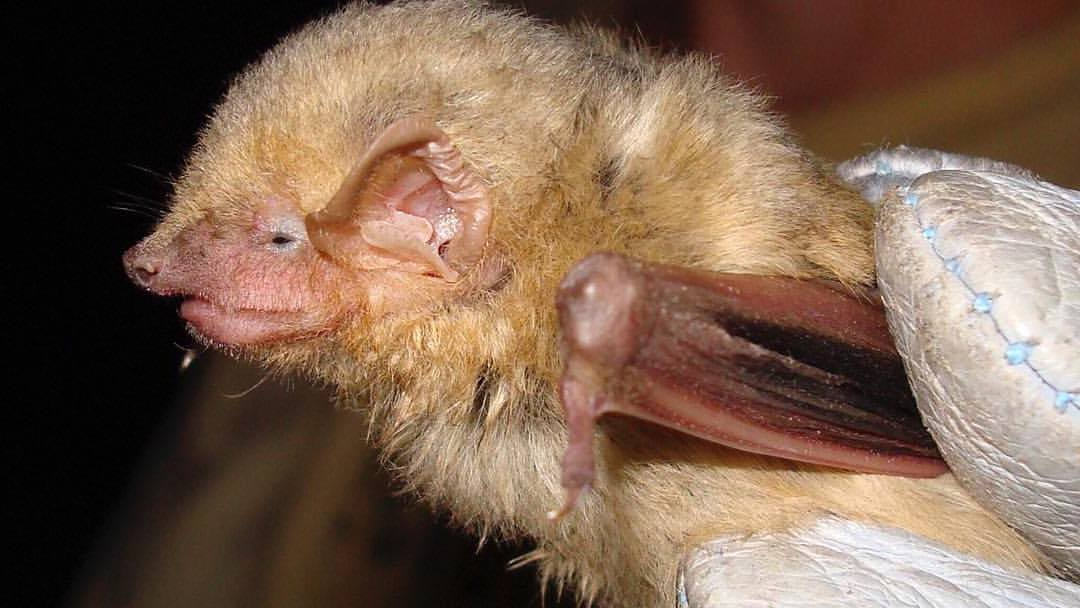

Conservation status
- Least Concern (IUCN 3.1)

Scientific classification
- Kingdom: Animalia
- Phylum: Chordata
- Class: Mammalia
- Order: Chiroptera
- Family: Vespertilionidae
- Genus: Lasiurus
- Species: L. xanthinus

Binomial name
- Lasiurus xanthinus Thomas, 1897
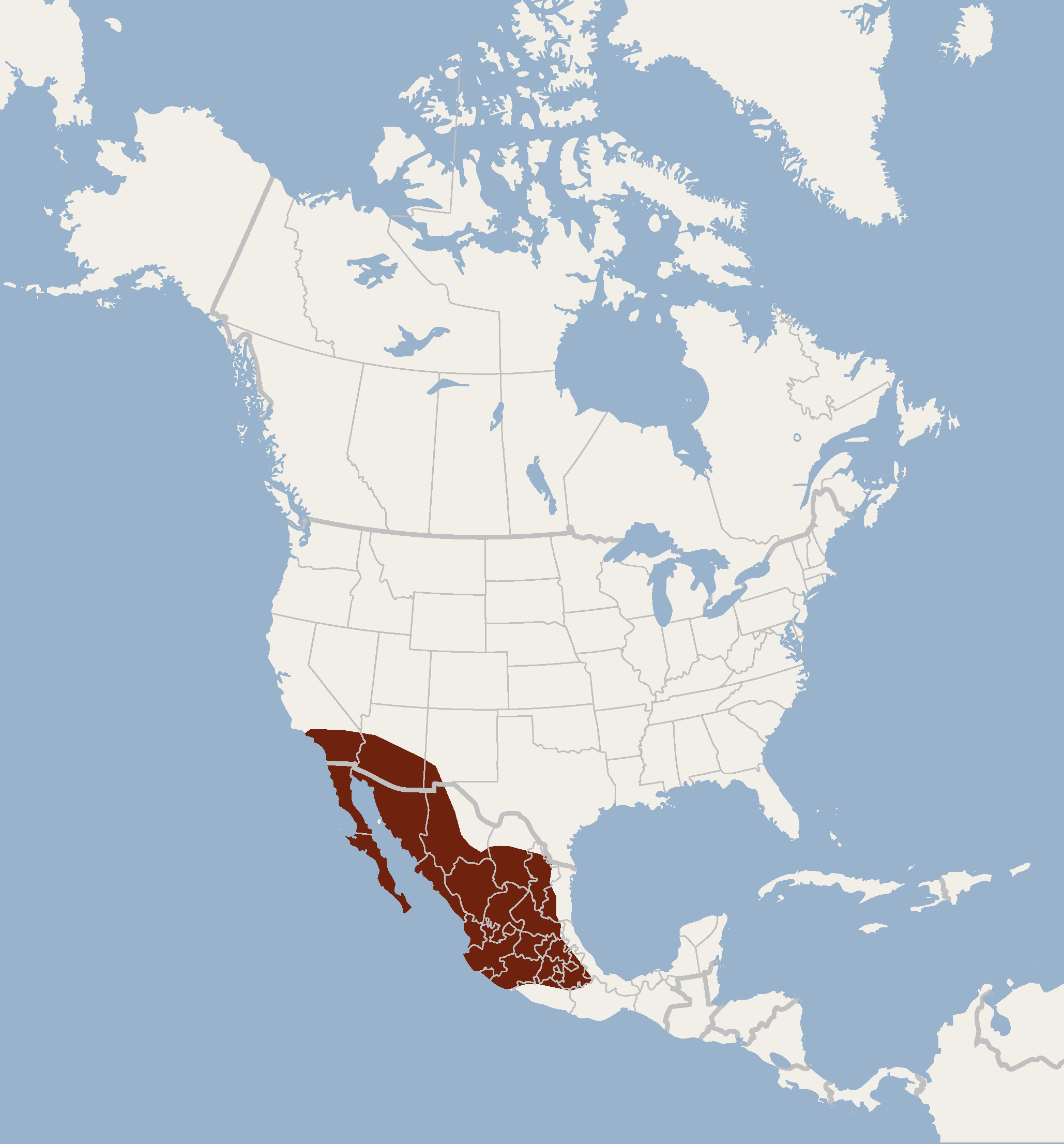
- Geographic range of the western yellow bat

Synonyms
- Dasypterus ega xanthinus Thomas, 1897; Lasiurus xanthinus Thomas, 1897

= Western yellow bat =

Species of foliage-roosting bat

The western yellow bat (Lasiurus xanthinus) is a species of vesper bat found in Mexico and the southwestern United States. This species roosts in trees such as Populus fremontii, Platanus wrightii, and Quercus arizonica. If available, the western yellow bat will use the dead fronds that encircle palm trees as a roosting site.

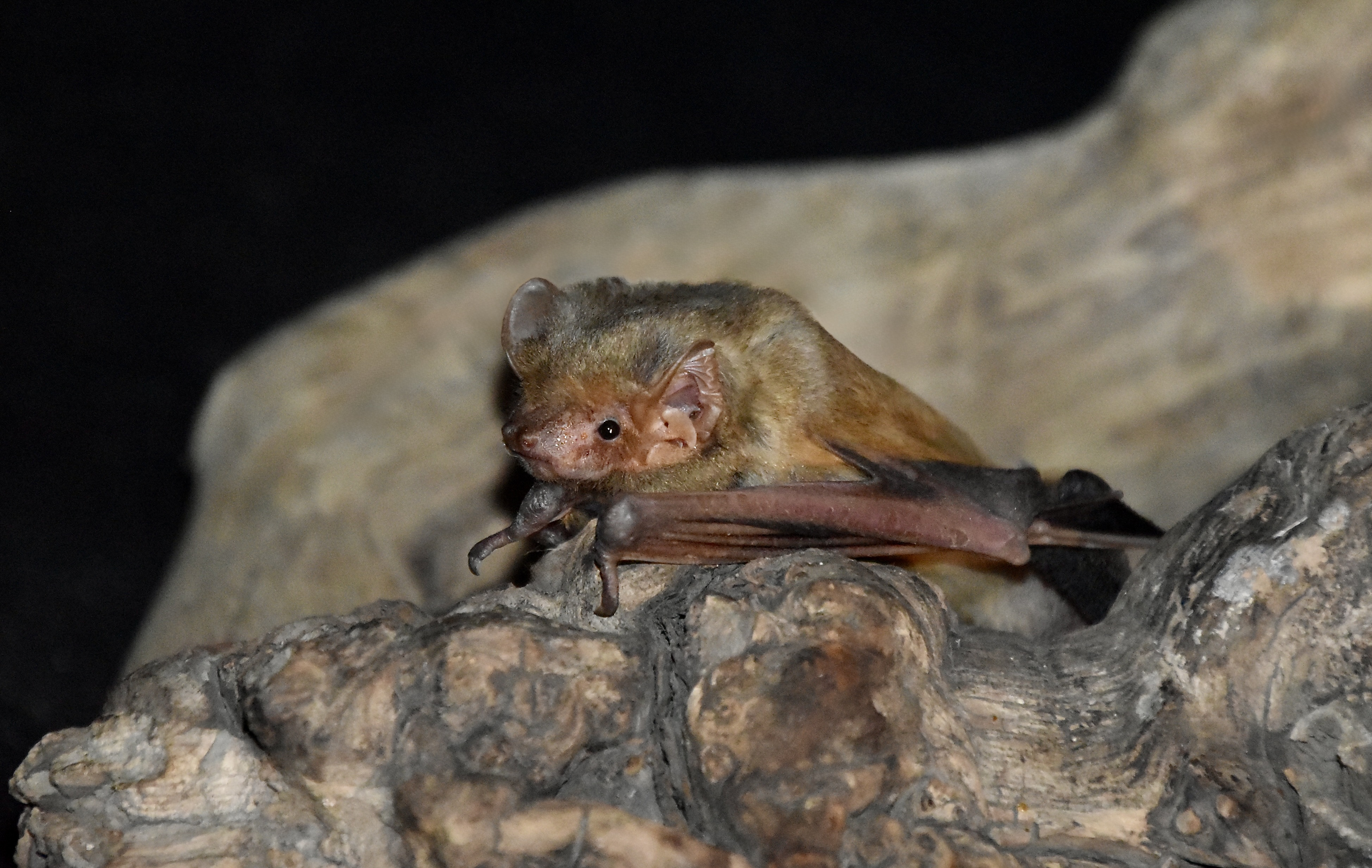
At a bat rescue center in Arizona.

== Taxonomy and etymology ==
It was described as a new subspecies of bat in 1897 by British zoologist Oldfield Thomas. He listed it as a subspecies of the southern yellow bat, with a trinomen of Dasypterus ega xanthinus. In 2015, Baird et al. argued that this species and other yellow bats should be in the genus Dasypterus, though others have since argued that Dasypterus should remain a subgenus of Lasiurus. In 1988, Baker et al. argued that it should be considered a full species based on its genetics. In a 2017 follow-up to their 2015 study, Baird et al. again expressed that Aeorestes, Dasypterus, and Lasiurus should be separate genera comprising the tribe Lasiurini. They stated that the genetic distance of the three genera was much greater than observed between other bat genera, on average. In contrast to the average of 12.0% inter-generic divergence reported from another study on bats, Aeorestes and Dasypterus varied 18.79%; Aeorestes and Lasiurus varied 19.05%; and Dasypterus and Lasiurus varied 19.79%. Its species name "xanthinus" is from Ancient Greek xanthos, meaning "pertaining to yellow."

== Description ==
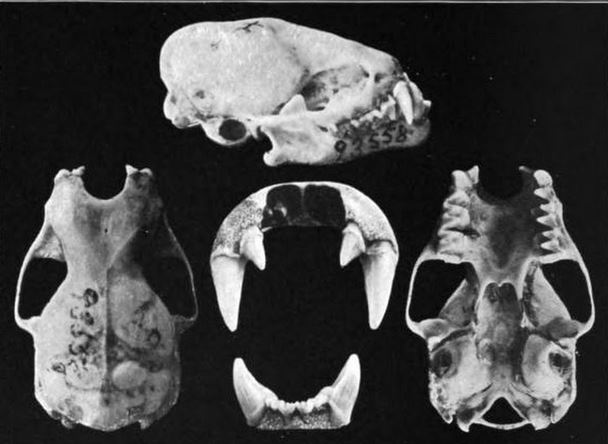
The cranial anatomy of the western yellow bat.

The western yellow bat is a small species, though it is larger than the southern yellow bat. Its fur is bright yellow. Individuals weigh approximately 16 g (0.56 oz). Its forearm length is 42–47 mm (1.7–1.9 in). Its dental formula is 1.1.2.33.1.2.3 for a total of 32 teeth.

== Range and habitat ==
Its range includes the Southwestern United States of Arizona, California, and New Mexico, in addition to parts of Mexico. It is found in West and Central Mexico, as well as Baja California.

== Conservation ==
As of 2017, it is evaluated as a least-concern species by the IUCN.
