= Pfeiffer's red bat =

Conservation status
- Near Threatened (IUCN 3.1)

Scientific classification
- Domain: Eukaryota
- Kingdom: Animalia
- Phylum: Chordata
- Class: Mammalia
- Order: Chiroptera
- Family: Vespertilionidae
- Genus: Lasiurus
- Species: L. pfeifferi

Binomial name
- Lasiurus pfeifferi Gundlach, 1861

Species of bat

Pfeiffer's red bat (Lasiurus pfeifferi) is a species of bat from the family Vespertilioninae and is endemic to Cuba. It is listed as Near Threatened by the IUCN Red List due to a significant population decline, caused by human population density on its endemic island, habitat conversion, and hurricanes. The species is likely insectivorous; fecal matter samples from a single bat contained only beetles. It may be a subspecies of the Seminole bat.

== See also ==
- Seminole bat
