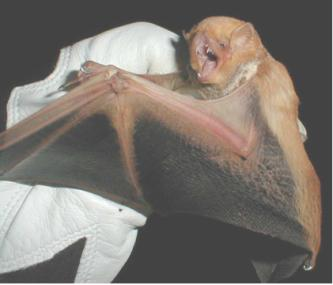

Scientific classification
- Kingdom: Animalia
- Phylum: Chordata
- Class: Mammalia
- Order: Chiroptera
- Family: Vespertilionidae
- Genus: Lasiurus
- Species: L. frantzii

Binomial name
- Lasiurus frantzii (Peters, 1871)
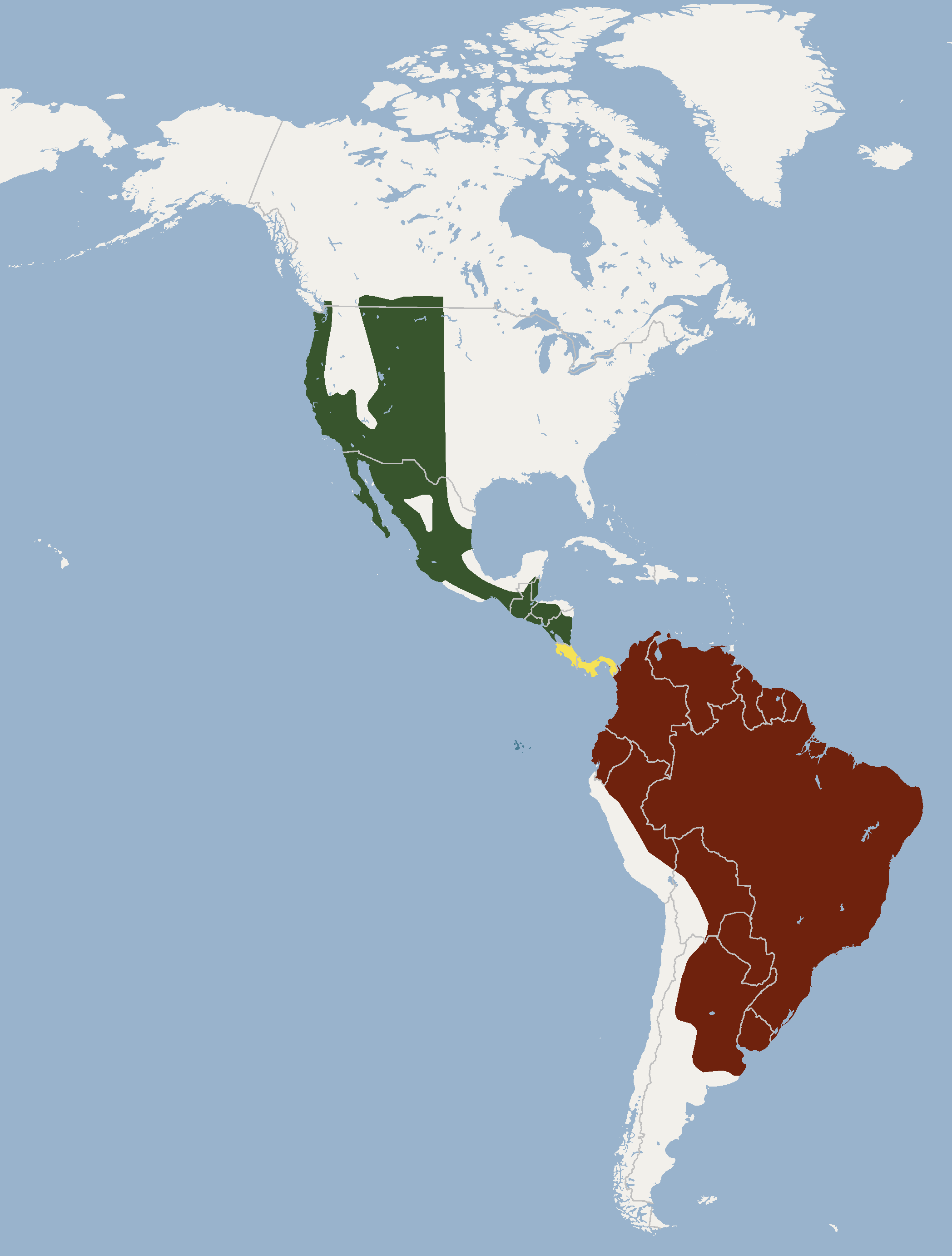
- Western red bat range in green and yellow

= Western red bat =

Species of bat

The western red bat or desert red bat (Lasiurus frantzii) is a species of microbat in the family Vespertilionidae. It is found in western North America and Central America.

== Taxonomy ==
Previously, it was believed to be a subspecies of the southern red bat (Lasiurus blossevillii), and was called Lasiurus blossevillii teliotis (abbreviated L. b. teliotis). The western red bat is also very similar to the eastern red bat and is distinguished from each other by minor differences, such as the lack of white-tipped hair in the dorsal pelage in the western red bat and the presence of sparse fur in the lower third of their tail. Their habitats are separated by the Rocky Mountains and may overlap.

== Distribution and habitat ==
The western red bat is found across western North America, ranging from southern Canada, through the western United States, down to Central America. The species has been recorded in Belize, Canada, Costa Rica, El Salvador, Guatemala, Honduras, Mexico, Nicaragua, Panama, and the United States. This species, along with most other Lasiurus, is a migratory species. It migrates to the southern parts of the Americas in the winter, and migrates north in the summer. Lasiurus frantzii is most often found in tree foliage, as are most species in the genus Lasiurus, and is a solitary species.

The common name implies that the desert red bat lives in the desert, but they actually hibernate under leaves in forests. Their coat color especially helps them camouflage with dead leaves.

== Reproduction ==
Unlike most bats, which bear only one pup per season, the western red bat can give birth to as many as four pups at once. To compensate for larger litters, desert red bats have four nipples rather than two. The bats mate during August and September. Pups are born about 90 days after mating. Before the bats are able to fly, the mother carries up to four pups at a time. It takes up to six weeks for the bats to fly by themselves and one to three years to mature.

== Ecology ==
Male and female red bats have different migrating routines. Female bats are usually found in warmer climates during the month of June.

== Diet and hunting ==
The desert red bat is an insectivore. They eat moths, flies, true bugs, beetles, and cicadas. The desert red bat is nocturnal. They use animal echolocation to hunt for insects. While they hunt, they are prone to predators, which include owls, blue jays, raccoons and opossum.
