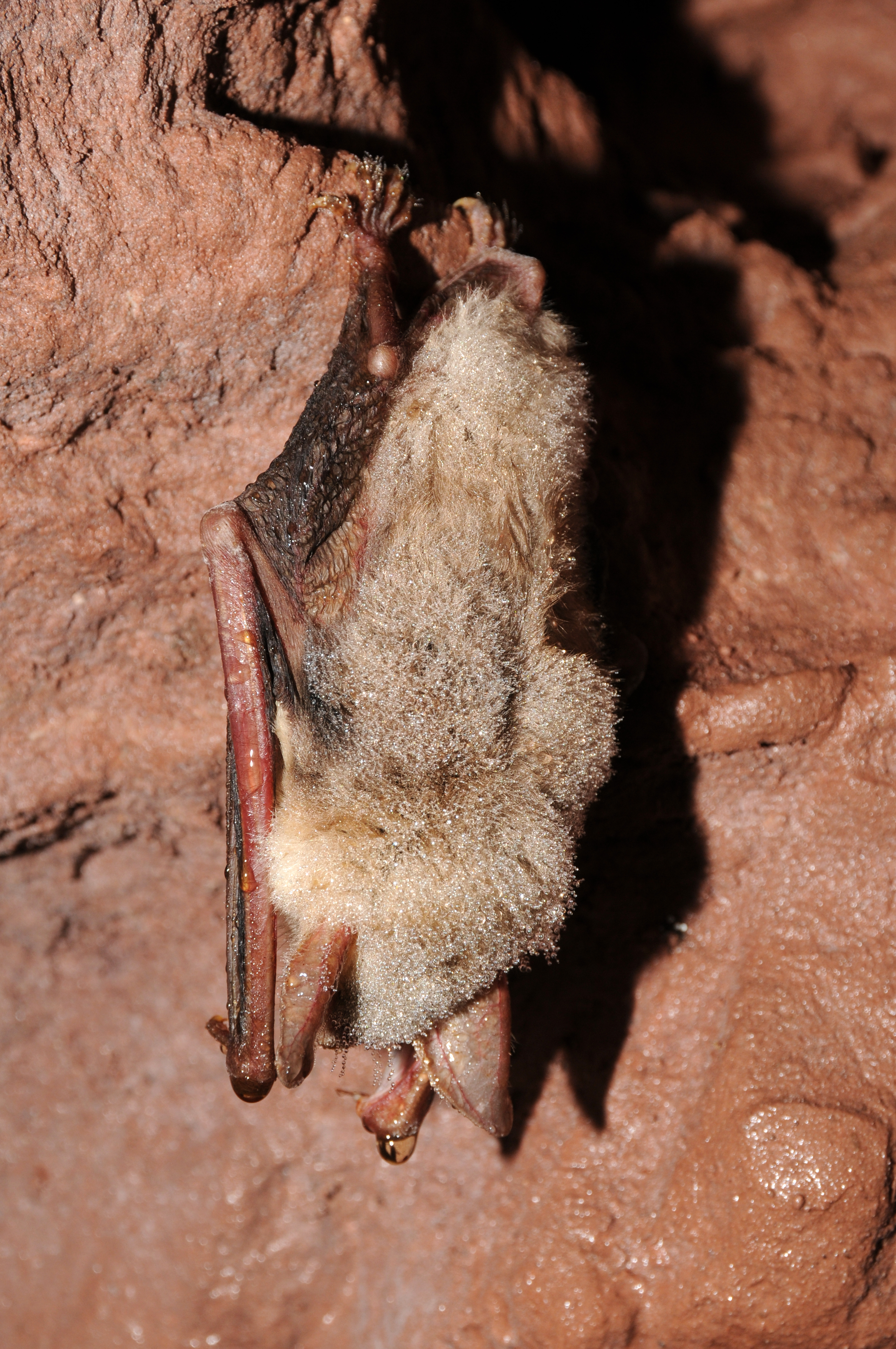
- Greater mouse-eared bat (Myotis myotis)

Scientific classification
- Kingdom: Animalia
- Phylum: Chordata
- Class: Mammalia
- Infraclass: Placentalia
- Order: Chiroptera
- Suborder: Yangochiroptera
- Superfamily: Vespertilionoidea
- Family: Vespertilionidae; Gray, 1821

Type genus
- Vespertilio Linnaeus, 1758

Subfamilies
- Vespertilioninae; Murininae; Myotinae; Kerivoulinae
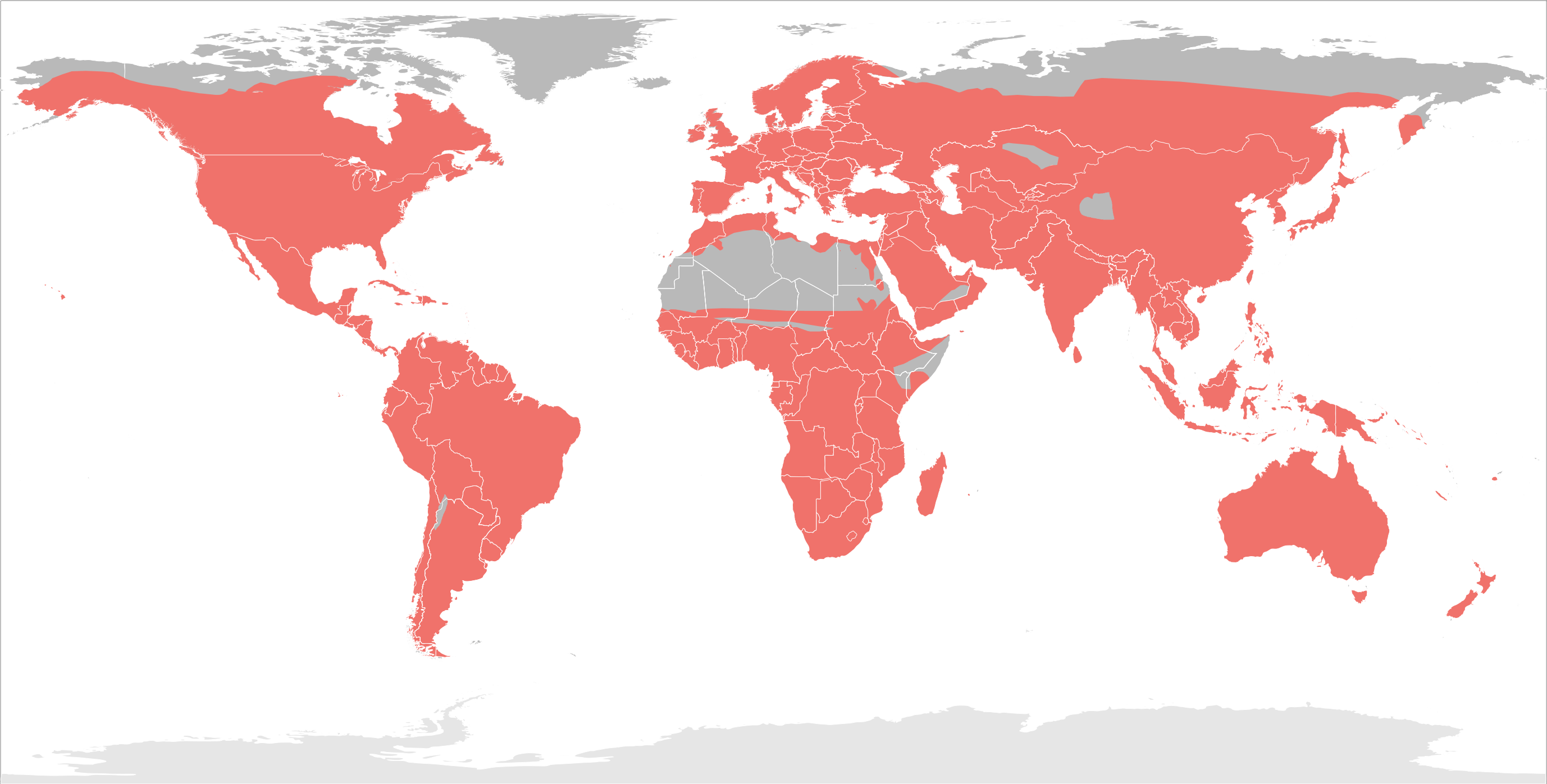
- Vespertilionidae distribution

= Vespertilionidae =

Vespertilionidae Temporal range: Early Eocene to recent

Family of microbats

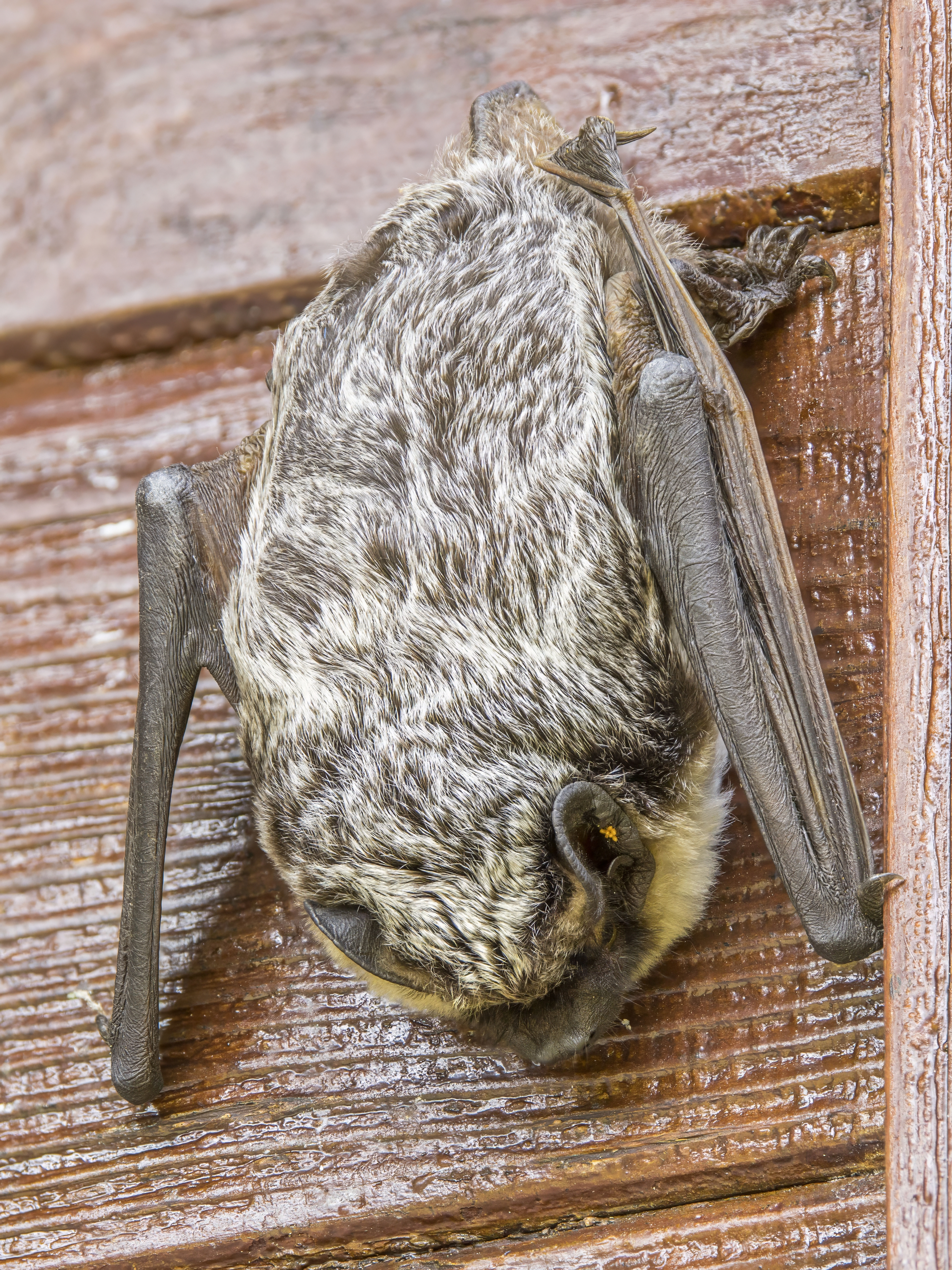
Parti-coloured bat Vespertilio murinus, Slovakia

Vespertilionidae is a family of microbats, of the order Chiroptera, flying, insect-eating mammals variously described as the common, vesper, or simple nosed bats. The vespertilionid family is the most diverse and widely distributed of bat families, specialised in many forms to occupy a range of habitats and ecological circumstances, and it is frequently observed for the subject of research. The facial features of the species are often simple, as they mainly rely on vocally emitted echolocation. The tails of the species are enclosed by the lower flight membranes between the legs. Over 300 species are distributed all over the world, on every continent except Antarctica.

It owes its name to the genus Vespertilio, which takes its name from a word for bat, vespertilio, derived from the Latin term vesper meaning 'evening'; they are termed "evening bats" and were once referred to as "evening birds". (The term "evening bat" also often refers more specifically to one of the species, Nycticeius humeralis.)

== Evolution ==
They are allied to the suborder Microchiroptera, the families of microbats separated from the flying foxes and fruit bats of the megabat group Megachiroptera. The treatments of bat taxonomy have also included a placement amongst the Vespertilioniformes, or Yangochiroptera, as suborder Vespertilionoidea.

Molecular data indicate the Vespertilionidae diverged from the Molossidae in the early Eocene period. The family is thought to have originated somewhere in Laurasia, possibly North America. A recently extinct species, Synemporion keana, is known from the Holocene of Hawaii.

== Characteristics ==
All species are carnivorous and most are insectivores. Exceptions are bats of genera Myotis and Pizonyx that catch fish and the larger Nyctalus species known to capture small passerine birds in flight. The dentition of the family varies between species; the dental formula of the family is:

Dentition
1–2.1.1–3.3
2–3.1.2–3.3

They rely mainly on echolocation to navigate and obtain food, but they lack the elaborate nose appendages of microbats that focus nasal emitted ultrasound. The ultrasound signal is usually produced orally, and many species have large external ears to capture and reflect sound, enabling them to discriminate and extract information.

The vespertilionids employ a range of flight techniques. The wing surface is extended to the lower limbs, and the tails of this family are enclosed in an interfemoral membrane. Some are relatively slow-flying genera, such as Pipistrellus, that manipulate the configuration of their broader wing shape and may give a fluttery appearance as they forage and glean. Others are specialised as long-winged genera, such as Lasiurus and Nyctalus, that use rapid pursuit to capture insects. The size range of the family is 3 to 13 cm (1.2 to 5.1 in) in head and body length; this excludes the tail, which is itself quite long in many species. They are generally brown or grey in colour, often an indiscriminate appearance as a 'little brown bat', although some species have fur that is brightly colored, with reds, oranges, and yellows all being known. The patterns of the superficial appearance include white patches or stripes that may distinguish some species.

Most species roost in caves, although some make use of hollow trees, rocky crevices, animal burrows, or other forms of shelter. Colony sizes also vary greatly, with some roosting alone, and others in groups up to a million individuals. Species native to temperate latitudes typically hibernate to avoid cooler weather, while a few of the tropical species employ aestivation as a method of evading extremes of climate.

== Systematics ==
- Vespertilionidae
  - Vespertilioninae
  - - - Myotinae
      - - Kerivoulinae
        - Murininae

Subfamily relationships of Vespertilionidae

The four subfamilies of Vespertilionidae separate the presumably related taxa, tribes, and genera of extant and extinct taxa. The subfamilial treatments, based on morphological, geographical, and ecological comparisons have been recombined since the inclusion of the phylogenetic implications of molecular genetics; only the Murininae and Kerivoulinae have not been changed in light of genetic analysis. Subfamilies that were once recognized as valid, such as the Nyctophilinae, are considered dubious, as molecular evidence suggests they are paraphyletic in their arrangements. Within the concept Yangochiroptera, an acknowledged cladistic treatment, the closest relatives to the family are the free-tailed bats of family Molossidae.

The monotypic genus Tomopeas, represented by the blunt-eared bat (Tomopeas ravum), is acknowledged as the potentially closest link between the Vespertilionidae and Molossidae, as it is the most basal member of the Molossidae and has intermediate characteristics of both families.

== Classification ==
The grouping of these subfamilies is the classification published by the American Society of Mammalogists. Other authorities raise three subfamilies more: Antrozoinae (which is here the separate family of pallid bats), Tomopeatinae (now regarded as a subfamily of the free-tailed bats), and Nyctophilinae (here included in Vespertilioninae).

Four subfamilies are recognized by Mammal Species of the World (2005), the highly diverse Vespertilioninae are also separated as tribes. Newer or resurrected genera are noted. The genus Cistugo is no longer included following its move to the separate family Cistugidae. Miniopterinae is additionally no longer recognized as a subfamily, as it was elevated to family status.

A 2021 study attempted to resolve the systematic relationships among the pipistrelle-like bats of sub-Saharan Africa and Madagascar, with systematic inferences based on genetic and morphological analyses of more than 400 individuals across all named genera and the majority of described African pipistrelle-like bat species, with a focus on previously unstudied samples of East African bats. The study proposed a revision of the pipistrelle-like bats in East Africa and described multiple new genera and species.

Family Vespertilionidae

- subfamily Kerivoulinae

- genus Kerivoula – painted bats
- genus Phoniscus

- subfamily Myotinae

- genus Eudiscopus
- genus Myotis – mouse-eared bats
- genus Submyotodon – broad-muzzled bats

- subfamily Murininae

- genus Harpiocephalus – hairy-winged bats
- genus Harpiola
- genus Murina – tube-nosed insectivorous bats

- subfamily Vespertilioninae
  - tribe Antrozoini
    - genus Antrozous
    - genus Bauerus
    - genus Rhogeessa
  - tribe Eptesicini
    - genus Arielulus
    - genus Eptesicus – house bats
    - genus Glauconycteris – butterfly bats
    - genus Hesperoptenus – false serotine bats
    - genus Histiotus – big-eared brown bats
    - genus Ia
    - genus Lasionycteris
    - genus Scoteanax – greater broad-nosed bats
    - genus Scotomanes
    - genus Scotorepens – lesser broad-nosed bats
    - genus Thainycteris
  - tribe incertae sedis
    - genus Rhyneptesicus
  - tribe Lasiurini
    - genus Aeorestes – hoary bats
    - genus Dasypterus – yellow bats
    - genus Lasiurus – hairy-tailed bats
  - tribe Nycticeiini
    - genus Nycticeius – evening bats
  - tribe Perimyotini
    - genus Parastrellus
    - genus Perimyotis
  - tribe Pipistrellini
    - genus Glischropus – thick-thumbed bats
    - genus Nyctalus – noctule bats
    - genus Pipistrellus – true pipistrelles
    - genus Scotoecus – house bats
    - genus Scotozous
    - genus Vansonia
  - tribe Plecotini
    - genus Barbastella – barbastelles or barbastelle bats
    - genus Corynorhinus – American lump-nosed bats
    - genus Euderma
    - genus Idionycteris
    - genus Otonycteris
    - genus Plecotus – lump-nosed bats
  - tribe Scotophilini
    - genus Scotophilus – Old World yellow bats
  - tribe Vespertilionini
    - genus Afronycteris
    - genus Cassistrellus – helmeted bats
    - genus Chalinolobus – wattled bats
    - genus Falsistrellus – false pipistrelles
    - genus Hypsugo – Asian pipistrelles
    - genus Laephotis – long-eared bats
    - genus Mimetillus – mimic bats
    - genus Mirostrellus
    - genus Neoromicia
    - genus Nycticeinops
    - genus Nyctophilus – New Guinean and Australian big-eared bats
    - genus Pharotis
    - genus Philetor
    - genus Pseudoromicia
    - genus Tylonycteris – bamboo bats
    - genus Vespadelus
    - genus Vespertilio – frosted bats
