= List of mammals of Missouri =

Location of Missouri within the United States.

78 species of wild mammals can be found the U.S. state of Missouri. Of these, 31 species are rodents, 16 are bats, 15 are carnivorans, 7 are eulipotyphlans, 3 are artiodactyls, another 3 are lagomorphs, and the armadillos, opossums, and primates each have one species in the state. Most species have established populations, but some, such as the gray wolf, are not native to the state but are still spotted on rare occasions. Two species, the eastern small-footed myotis and little brown bat, are classified as endangered species by the IUCN. Other species, such as feral or domesticated mammals, are not included on this list.

Most species listed in this article are derived from the work The Wild Mammals of Missouri, a 2001 catalogue of all known wild mammal species in the state. Three species in the book, the red wolf (Canis rufus), Townsend's big-eared bat (Corynorhinus townsendii), and white-tailed jackrabbit (Lepus townsendii) are not included as there are no longer any individuals present in Missouri. Unless otherwise noted, range information is provided by the Missouri Department of Conservation's Field Guide.

== Artiodactyla ==
Common name and image	Scientific name	Range	Status
Family Bovidae — one species
American bison	Bison bison Linnaeus, 1758	Small populations in Barton and Harrison counties. Others live on some private ranches.	Near threatened
Family Cervidae (deer) — two species
Elk	Cervus canadensis Erxleben, 1777	Carter, Reynolds, and Shannon counties. Occasional sightings in other areas.	Least concern
White-tailed deer	Odocoileus virginianus Zimmermann, 1780	Statewide	Least concern

== Carnivora ==
Common name and image	Scientific name	Range	Status
Family Canidae (dogs) — four species
Coyote	Canis latrans Say, 1823	Statewide, most common in northern and western grasslands.	Least concern
Gray wolf	Canis lupus Linnaeus, 1758	No permanent populations. Sometimes spotted while travelling between states.	Least concern
Red fox	Vulpes vulpes Linnaeus, 1758	Statewide, most common in the north and west.	Least concern
Gray fox	Urocyon cinereoargenteus Schreber, 1775	Statewide, most common in the Ozarks.	Least concern
Family Felidae (cats) — two species
Bobcat	Lynx rufus Schreber, 1777	Statewide	Least concern
Cougar	Puma concolor Linnaeus, 1771	No known permanent populations, but there have been numerous sightings statewide.	Least concern
Family Mephitidae — two species
Striped skunk	Mephitis mephitis Schreber, 1776	Statewide	Least concern
Eastern spotted skunk	Spilogale putorius Linnaeus, 1758	Statewide	Vulnerable
Family Mustelidae — five species
North American river otter	Lontra canadensis Schreber, 1777	Statewide	Least concern
Least weasel	Mustela nivalis Linnaeus, 1766	Most areas in the north.	Least concern
Long-tailed weasel	Neogale frenata Lichtenstein, 1831	Statewide, most common in the south.	Least concern
American mink	Neogale vison Schreber, 1777	Statewide, most common in the Mississippi River lowlands.	Least concern
American badger	Taxidea taxus Schreber, 1777	Statewide, most common in the Osage and Dissected Till Plains.	Least concern
Family Procyonidae — one species
Common raccoon	Procyon lotor Linnaeus, 1758	Statewide	Least concern
Family Ursidae (bears) — one species
American black bear	Ursus americanus Pallas, 1780	Statewide, most concentrated in the south.	Least concern

== Chiroptera ==
Common name and image	Scientific name	Range	Status
Family Molossidae (free-tailed bats) — two species
Big free-tailed bat	Nyctinomops macrotis Gray, 1839	Native to South America, Central America, Mexico, and the Southeastern US. Occasional wanderers have been recorded in the state.	Least concern
Mexican free-tailed bat	Tadarida brasiliensis Geoffroy, 1824	Individuals from the Southwestern US wander into the state on rare occasions.	Least concern
Family Vespertilionidae — fourteen species
Rafinesque's big-eared bat	Corynorhinus rafinesquii Lesson, 1827	Southeastern corner	Least concern
Big brown bat	Eptesicus fuscus Beauvois, 1796	Statewide	Least concern
Silver-haired bat	Lasionycteris noctivagans Le Conte, 1831	Statewide; most common during spring and fall.	Least concern
Eastern red bat	Lasurius borealis Müller, 1776	Statewide; most common in May–September, generally rare in winter, especially in the north.	Least concern
Hoary bat	Lasurius cinereus Beauvois, 1796	Statewide	Least concern
Seminole bat	Lasiurus seminolus Rhoads, 1895	The northern limits of its summer migration have been expanding, likely because of climate change. Can now be found in the far south, with some reaching as far north as Pulaski county.	Least concern
Southeastern myotis	Myotis austroriparius Rhoads, 1897	Southeastern corner	Least concern
Gray bat	Myotis grisescens Howell, 1909	Most common in the Ozarks, but can be found in some areas north of the Missouri River.	Vulnerable
Eastern small-footed myotis	Myotis leibii Audubon & Bachman, 1842	Southwestern areas; has been identified in Washington, Iron, Madison counties.	Endangered
Little brown bat	Myotis lucifugus Le Conte, 1831	Statewide	Endangered
Northern long-eared bat	Myotis septentrionalis Trouessart, 1897	Statewide except for southwestern corner.	Near threatened
Indiana bat	Myotis sodalis Miller & Allen, 1928	Most areas in the summer, found in the north during winter.	Near threatened
Evening bat	Nycticeius humeralis Rafinesque, 1818	Statewide	Least concern
Tricolored bat	Perimyotis subflavus F. Cuvier, 1832	Statewide	Vulnerable

== Cingulata ==
Common name and image	Scientific name	Range	Status
Family Dasypodidae — one species
Nine-banded armadillo	Dasypus novemcinctus Linnaeus, 1758	Statewide except for the far north.	Least concern

== Didelphimorphia ==
Common name and image	Scientific name	Range	Status
Family Didelphidae (opossums) — one species
Virginia opossum	Didelphis virginiana Kerr, 1792	Statewide, less common in the northwest and southeast.	Least concern

== Eulipotyphla ==
Common name and image	Scientific name	Range	Status
Family Soricidae (shrews) — six species
Northern short-tailed shrew	Blarina brevicauda Say, 1823	Together, the short-tailed shrews are found statewide. However, the range of individual Blarina species is somewhat unknown.	Least concern
Southern short-tailed shrew	Blarina carolinensis Bachman, 1837	Together, the short-tailed shrews are found statewide. However, the range of individual Blarina species is somewhat unknown.	Least concern
Elliot's short-tailed shrew	Blarina hylophaga Elliot, 1899	Together, the short-tailed shrews are found statewide. However, the range of individual Blarina species is somewhat unknown.	Least concern
North American least shrew	Cryptotis parva Say, 1823	Statewide	Least concern
Cinereus shrew	Sorex cinereus Kerr, 1792	Northern half of the state, most common near streams and in floodplains.	Least concern
Southeastern shrew	Sorex longirostris Bachman, 1837	Statewide except for the far northwest.	Least concern
Family Talpidae — one species
Eastern mole	Scalopus aquaticus Linnaeus, 1758	Statewide	Least concern

== Lagomorpha ==
Common name and image	Scientific name	Range	Status
Family Leporidae — three species
Black-tailed jackrabbit	Lepus californicus Gray, 1837	Eastern areas	Least concern
Swamp rabbit	Sylvilagus aquaticus Bachman, 1837	Southeastern Mississippi lowlands	Least concern
Eastern cottontail	Sylvilagus floridanus J. A. Allen, 1890	Statewide	Least concern

== Primates ==
Common name and image	Scientific name	Range	Status
Family Hominidae (great apes) — one species
Human Mike Kehoe, current governor of Missouri	Homo sapiens Linnaeus, 1758	Statewide, largest settlements are Kansas City and St. Louis.	Not evaluated

== Rodentia ==
Common name and image	Scientific name	Range	Status
Family Castoridae (beavers) — one species
North American beaver	Castor canadensis Kuhl, 1820	Statewide near rivers and streams	Least concern
Family Cricetidae — sixteen species
Eastern meadow vole	Microtus pennsylvanicus Ord, 1815	Northern areas, most common in stream valleys and floodplains.	Least concern
Woodland vole	Microtus pinetorum Le Conte, 1830	Statewide	Least concern
Prairie vole	Microtus ochrogaster Wagner, 1842	Statewide	Least concern
Eastern woodrat	Neotoma floridana Ord, 1818	Known occurrences in the southern half of the state, potentially present in the north.	Least concern
Golden mouse	Ochrotomys nuttalli Harlan, 1832	Southeastern areas	Least concern
Muskrat	Ondatra zibethicus Linnaeus, 1766	Statewide	Least concern
Marsh rice rat	Oryzomys palustris Harlan, 1837	Extreme southeast	Least concern
Texas mouse	Peromyscus attwateri Allen, 1895	Southwestern areas	Least concern
Cotton mouse	Peromyscus gossypinus Le Conte, 1853	Southeastern areas	Least concern
Eastern deer mouse	Peromyscus maniculatus Wagner, 1845	Statewide	Least concern
White-footed mouse	Peromyscus leucopus Rafinesque, 1818	Statewide	Least concern
Fulvous harvest mouse	Reithrodontomys fulvescens J.A.Allen, 1894	Southwestern areas	Least concern
Western harvest mouse	Reithrodontomys megalotis Baird, 1857	Statewide	Least concern
Plains harvest mouse	Reithrodontomys montanus Baird, 1855	Western areas	Least concern
Hispid cotton rat	Sigmodon hispidus Say and Ord, 1825	Statewide except for northeast	Least concern
Southern bog lemming	Synaptomys cooperi Baird, 1857	Statewide except for southwestern corner	Least concern
Family Echimyidae — one species
Nutria	Myocastor coypus Molina, 1782	Introduced, now statewide and is most common in the southeast.	Least concern
Family Geomyidae (gophers) — one species
Plains pocket gopher	Geomys bursarius Shaw, 1800	North and eastern areas	Least concern
Family Heteromyidae — one species
Plains pocket mouse	Perognathus flavescens Merriam, 1889	Northwestern corner; has been found in Atchison county.	Least concern
Family Muridae — three species
House mouse	Mus musculus Linnaeus, 1758	Introduced, now statewide.	Least concern
Brown rat	Rattus norvegicus Berkenhout, 1769	Introduced, now statewide.	Least concern
Black rat	Rattus rattus Linnaeus, 1758	Introduced, now in St. Louis; potentially in Kansas City.	Least concern
Family Sciuridae (squirrels) — seven species
Southern flying squirrel	Glaucomys volans Linnaeus, 1758	Statewide	Least concern
Thirteen-lined ground squirrel	Ictidomys tridecemlineatus Mitchill, 1821	Mostly in northwestern areas.	Least concern
Groundhog	Marmota monax Linnaeus, 1758	Statewide, less common in the Mississippi lowlands.	Least concern
Franklin's Ground Squirrel	Poliocitellus franklinii Howell, 1938	Northern quarter	Least concern
Eastern gray squirrel	Scuirus carolinensis Gmelin, 1788	Statewide, most common in the Ozarks and Mississippi lowlands.	Least concern
Fox squirrel	Sciurus niger Linnaeus, 1758	Statewide, more common in the north and western plains.	Least concern
Eastern Chipmunk	Tamias striatus Linnaeus, 1758	Statewide, most common in the Ozarks.	Least concern
Family Zapodidae (jumping mice) — one species
Meadow jumping mouse	Zapus hudsonius Zimmermann, 1780	Statewide	Least concern
