= List of mammals of Georgia (U.S. state) =

This is a list of the mammals native to the U.S. state of Georgia.

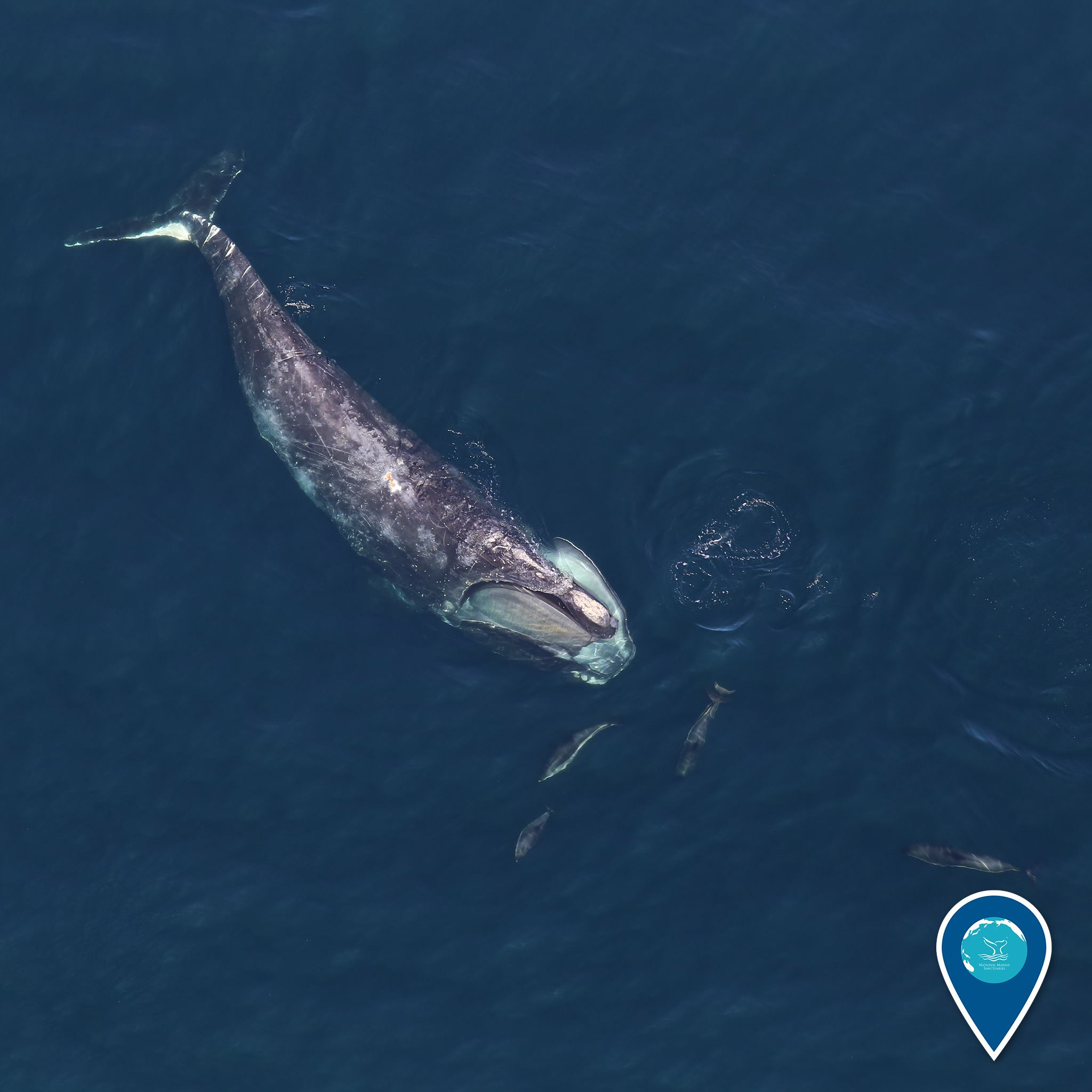
The critically endangered North Atlantic right whale is the state marine mammal of Georgia.

| Family | Scientific name | Common names | Range within Georgia | Conservation status |
|---|---|---|---|---|
| Didelphidae | Didelphis virginiana | Virginia opossum | Statewide | least concern |
| Trichechidae | Trichechus manatus | West Indian manatee | Vagrant; Savannah harbor, Jekyll Creek, Little Satilla River, and Cumberland Island | vulnerable |
| Dasypodidae | Dasypus novemcinctus | Nine-banded armadillo | Common in lower Coastal Plain sand hills | least concern |
| Soricidae | Blarina brevicauda | Northern short-tailed shrew | North of the fall line | least concern |
| Soricidae | Blarina carolinensis | Southern short-tailed shrew | Coastal Plain south of the fall line, and extreme northwest Georgia | least concern |
| Soricidae | Cryptotis parva | Least shrew | Statewide, most abundant in the Coastal Plain | least concern |
| Soricidae | Sorex cinereus | Cinereus shrew | Towns County, Georgia | least concern |
| Soricidae | Sorex fumeus | Smoky shrew | Uncommon, found in mountains of Fannin, Murray, Rabun, Towns, and Union counties. | least concern |
| Soricidae | Sorex hoyi | American pygmy shrew | Rare; identified in Towns County, Georgia | least concern |
| Soricidae | Sorex longirostris | Southeastern shrew | Statewide but uncommon | least concern |
| Talpidae | Condylura cristata | Star-nosed mole | Very rare; found in Charlton, Chatham, Clinch, Effingham, Jackson, and Union counties | least concern |
| Talpidae | Parascalops breweri | Hairy-tailed mole | Appalachian Mountains, extreme northeastern part of the state | least concern |
| Talpidae | Scalopus aquaticus | Eastern mole | State-wide | least concern |
| Leporidae | Sylvilagus aquaticus | Swamp rabbit | Piedmont and Ridge and Valley, and western upper Coastal Plain | least concern |
| Leporidae | Sylvilagus floridanus | Eastern cottontail, cottontail rabbit | State-wide | least concern |
| Leporidae | Sylvilagus obscurus | Appalachian cottontail | Appalachian Mountains | near-threatened |
| Leporidae | Sylvilagus palustris | Marsh rabbit | Eastern Coastal Plain | least concern |
| Castoridae | Castor canadensis | American beaver | State-wide | least concern |
| Geomyidae | Geomys pinetis | Southeastern pocket gopher | Coastal Plain | least concern |
| Echimyidae | Myocastor coypus | Coypu, nutria | Introduced: swamps of south central Georgia | least concern |
| Sciurinae | Glaucomys volans | Southern flying squirrel | State-wide | least concern |
| Sciurinae | Marmota monax | Groundhog, woodchuck | Mountains | least concern |
| Sciurinae | Sciurus carolinensis | Eastern gray squirrel | State-wide | least concern |
| Sciurinae | Sciurus niger | Eastern fox squirrel | State-wide, but less common in mountains and Piedmont | least concern |
| Sciurinae | Tamias striatus | Eastern chipmunk | Mountains, Piedmont, and upper-western Coastal Plain | least concern |
| Sciurinae | Tamiasciurus hudsonicus | American red squirrel | Mountains | least concern |
| Cricetidae | Microtus pennsylvanicus | Meadow vole | Clarke, Newton, Oconee, and Polk Counties. | least concern |
| Cricetidae | Microtus pinetorum | Woodland vole | State-wide, but more common in Piedmont and Mountain regions. | least concern |
| Cricetidae | Myodes gapperi | Southern red-backed vole | Mountains of Union, Towns, and Rabun counties | least concern |
| Cricetidae | Neofiber alleni | Round-tailed muskrat, water rat | Southeastern Georgia, near the Okefenokee Swamp. | least concern |
| Cricetidae | Neotoma floridana | Eastern woodrat | Coastal Plain and mountains | least concern |
| Cricetidae | Neotoma magister | Allegheny woodrat | north-western part of the state | near-threatened |
| Cricetidae | Ochrotomys nuttalli | Golden mouse | State-wide | least concern |
| Cricetidae | Ondatra zibethicus | Muskrat | Mountains, Ridge and Valley Province, Piedmont, and upper Coastal Plain | least concern |
| Cricetidae | Oryzomys palustris | Marsh rice rat | State-wide | least concern |
| Cricetidae | Peromyscus gossypinus | Cotton mouse | Primarily Coastal Plain, but can also be found in Ridge and Valley Province and Piedmont | least concern |
| Cricetidae | Peromyscus leucopus | White-footed mouse, woodmouse | Restricted to Piedmont and mountains | least concern |
| Cricetidae | Peromyscus maniculatus | Deer mouse | Summits of higher mountains | least concern |
| Cricetidae | Peromyscus polionotus | Oldfield mouse, beach mouse | State-wide, except high mountain areas | least concern |
| Cricetidae | Reithrodontomys humulis | Eastern harvest mouse | State-wide | least concern |
| Cricetidae | Sigmodon hispidus | Hispid cotton rat, cotton rat | State-wide | least concern |
| Dipodidae | Napaeozapus insignis | Woodland jumping mouse | Rare, Mountains | least concern |
| Dipodidae | Zapus hudsonius | Meadow jumping mouse | Rare in Georgia. Recorded in Clarke, Oconee, Hall, and Meriwether Counties. | least concern |
| Muridae | Mus musculus | House mouse | Introduced: state-wide | least concern |
| Muridae | Rattus norvegicus | Brown rat, Norway rat, wharf rat | Introduced: state-wide | least concern |
| Muridae | Rattus rattus | Black rat, roof rat | Introduced: the lower Coastal Plain | least concern |
| Lemuridae | Lemur catta | Ring-tailed lemur | Introduced to St. Catherines Island | Endangered |
| Bovidae | Bison bison | American bison | Extirpated from Georgia since the early 1800s | near threatened |
| Cervidae | Cervus canadensis | Elk | Reintroduced; eastern elk subspecies (C. c. canadensis) is extinct, Rocky Mountain elk subspecies (C. c. nelsoni) introduced | least concern |
| Cervidae | Dama dama | European fallow deer | Introduced: Little St. Simons Island | least concern |
| Cervidae | Odocoileus virginianus | White-tailed deer | State-wide | least concern |
| Suidae | Sus scrofa | Wild boar | Introduced: lower Coastal Plain and mountains | least concern |
| Canidae | Canis latrans | Coyote | Primarily in the western half of Georgia | least concern |
| Canidae | Canis rufus | Red wolf | Extirpated | critically endangered |
| Canidae | Urocyon cinereoargenteus | Gray fox | State-wide | least concern |
| Canidae | Vulpes vulpes | Red fox | Piedmont and mountainous regions, occasionally in the Coastal Plain | least concern |
| Felidae | Lynx rufus | Bobcat | State-wide | least concern |
| Felidae | Puma concolor | Cougar | Extirpated; eastern cougar population is extinct, occasional vagrant from Florida reported | least concern |
| Mephitidae | Mephitis mephitis | Striped skunk | State-wide | least concern |
| Mephitidae | Spilogale putorius | Eastern spotted skunk | State-wide, except not on the eastern portion of the Coastal Plain | vulnerable |
| Mustelidae | Lontra canadensis | North American river otter | Coastal Plain and salt marshes. Rare above the fall line. | least concern |
| Mustelidae | Neogale frenata | Long-tailed weasel | State-wide | least concern |
| Mustelidae | Neogale vison | American mink | State-wide | least concern |
| Procyonidae | Procyon lotor | Raccoon | State-wide | least concern |
| Ursidae | Ursus americanus | American black bear | Mountains, Ocmulgee River area, along the fall line, and in the Okefenokee Swamp. | least concern |
| Otariidae | Zalophus californianus | California sea lion | Introduced | least concern |
| Phocidae | Cystophora cristata | Hooded seal | Known only from records – presumed extirpated | vulnerable |
| Balaenidae | Eubalaena glacialis | North Atlantic right whale, black right whale | Known from three stranding records | critically endangered |
| Balaenopteridae | Balaenoptera brydei | Bryde's whale | Known from a 1978 stranding | least concern |
| Balaenopteridae | Megaptera novaeangliae | Humpback whale | Known from a stranding on Sapelo Island | least concern |
| Delphinidae | Globicephala macrorhynchus | Short-finned pilot whale | Known from 17 stranding events | least concern |
| Delphinidae | Pseudorca crassidens | False killer whale | Known from a single stranding | near threatened |
| Delphinidae | Stenella frontalis | Atlantic spotted dolphin | Known from sightings off of Georgia's shore | least concern |
| Delphinidae | Steno bredanensis | Rough-toothed dolphin | Known from a stranding event involving two individuals | least concern |
| Delphinidae | Tursiops truncatus | Common bottlenose dolphin, Atlantic bottlenose dolphin | Known from over forty strandings | least concern |
| Kogiidae | Kogia breviceps | Pygmy sperm whale | Known from 24 strandings | least concern |
| Kogiidae | Kogia simus | Dwarf sperm whale | Known from strandings | least concern |
| Ziphiidae | Mesoplodon densirostris | Blainville's beaked whale, tropical beaked whale | Known from a stranding on Cumberland Island | data deficient |
| Ziphiidae | Mesoplodon europaeus | Gervais' beaked whale | Known from a stranding on Ossabaw Island | data deficient |
| Ziphiidae | Ziphius cavirostris | Cuvier's beaked whale, goose-beaked whale | Known from six stranding records. | least concern |
| Molossidae | Tadarida brasiliensis | Mexican free-tailed bat | Uncommon, in Piedmont and Coastal Plain | least concern |
| Vespertilionidae | Corynorhinus rafinesquii | Rafinesque's big-eared bat | Uncommon, state-wide | least concern |
| Vespertilionidae | Eptesicus fuscus | Big brown bat | Common state-wide | least concern |
| Vespertilionidae | Lasionycteris noctivagans | Silver-haired bat | Common, except in lower Coastal Plain | least concern |
| Vespertilionidae | Lasiurus borealis | Eastern red bat | State-wide | least concern |
| Vespertilionidae | Lasiurus cinereus | Hoary bat | Uncommon, state-wide | least concern |
| Vespertilionidae | Lasiurus intermedius | Northern yellow bat | Rare, Coastal Plain | least concern |
| Vespertilionidae | Lasiurus seminolus | Seminole bat | State-wide, mostly Coastal Plain and Piedmont | least concern |
| Vespertilionidae | Myotis austroriparius | Southeastern myotis | Southwestern Georgia | least concern |
| Vespertilionidae | Myotis grisescens | Gray bat, gray myotis | West Georgia | vulnerable |
| Vespertilionidae | Myotis leibii | Eastern small-footed myotis | Rare, Dade and Union counties | endangered |
| Vespertilionidae | Myotis lucifugus | Little brown bat | Bartow, Dade, Polk, Towns, and Walker counties | endangered |
| Vespertilionidae | Myotis septentrionalis | Northern long-eared bat | Rare, in Mountain and Piedmont regions. Often confused with Myotis keenii, Keen's myotis, in older literature. | near threatened |
| Vespertilionidae | Myotis sodalis | Indiana bat | Dade County in Northwestern Georgia. | near threatened |
| Vespertilionidae | Nycticeius humeralis | Evening bat | State-wide | least concern |
| Vespertilionidae | Perimyotis subflavus | Tricolored bat, eastern pipistrelle | State-wide | vulnerable |

== Gallery ==
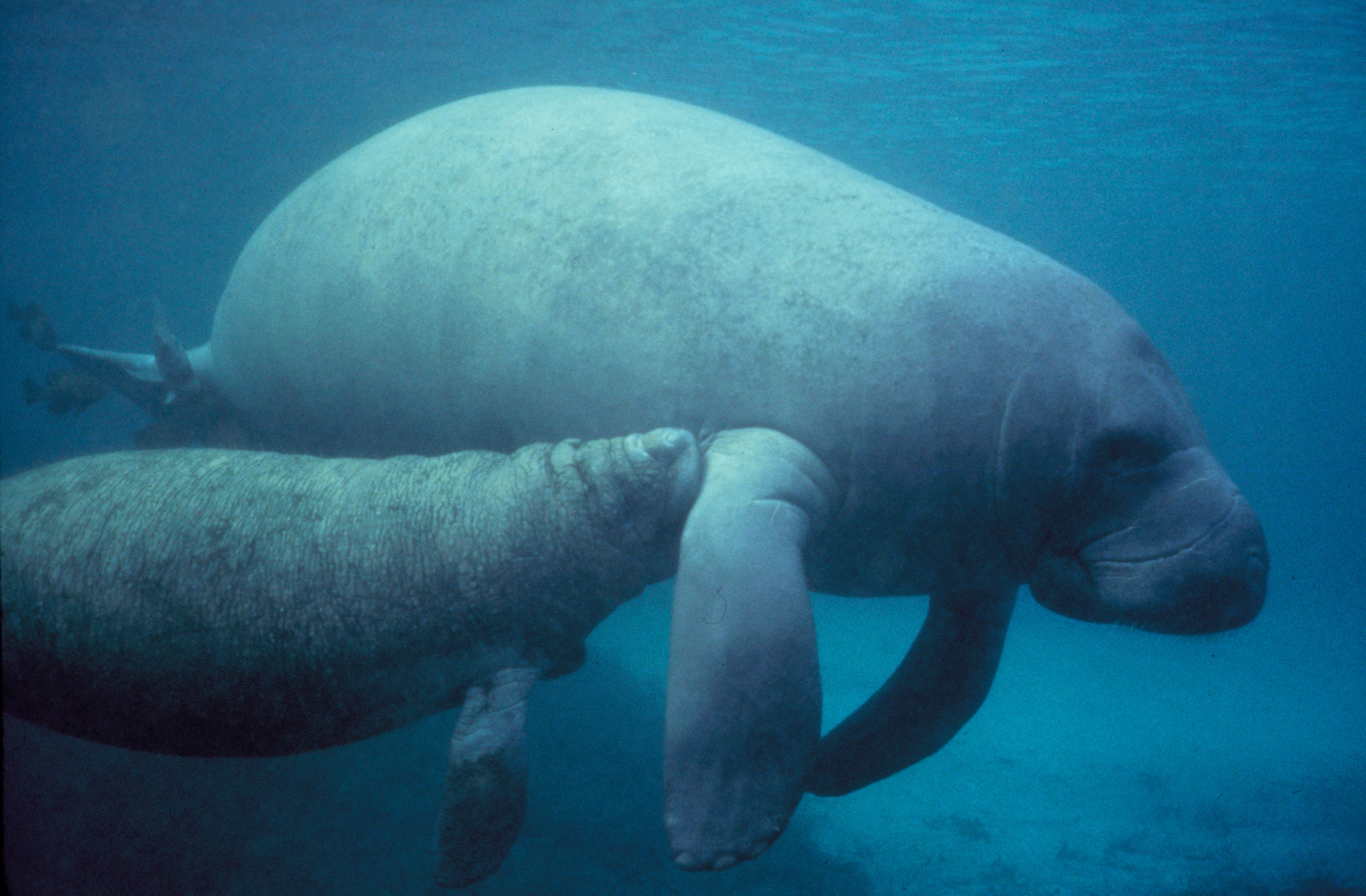
West Indian manatee, vulnerable

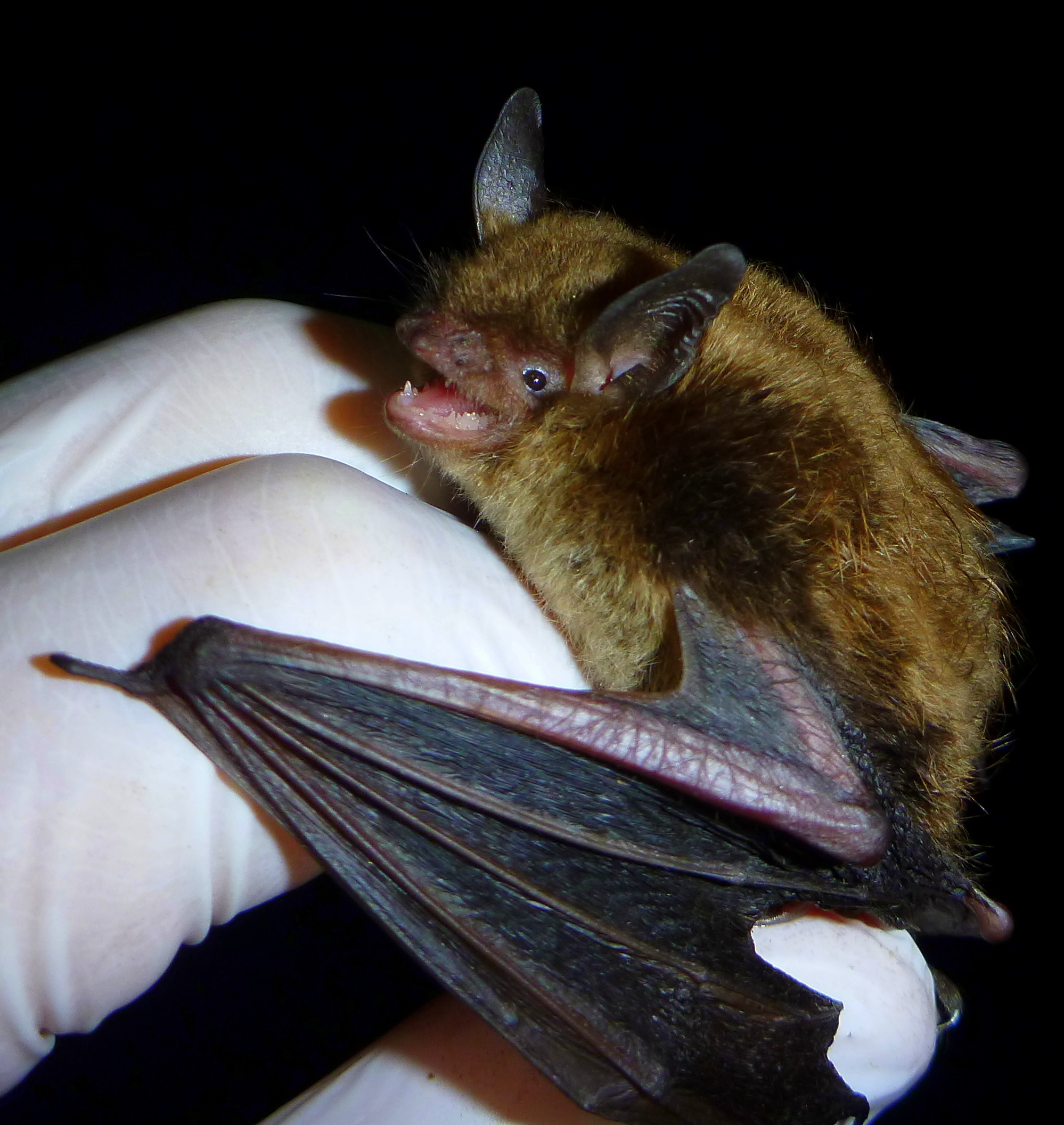
Little brown bat, endangered

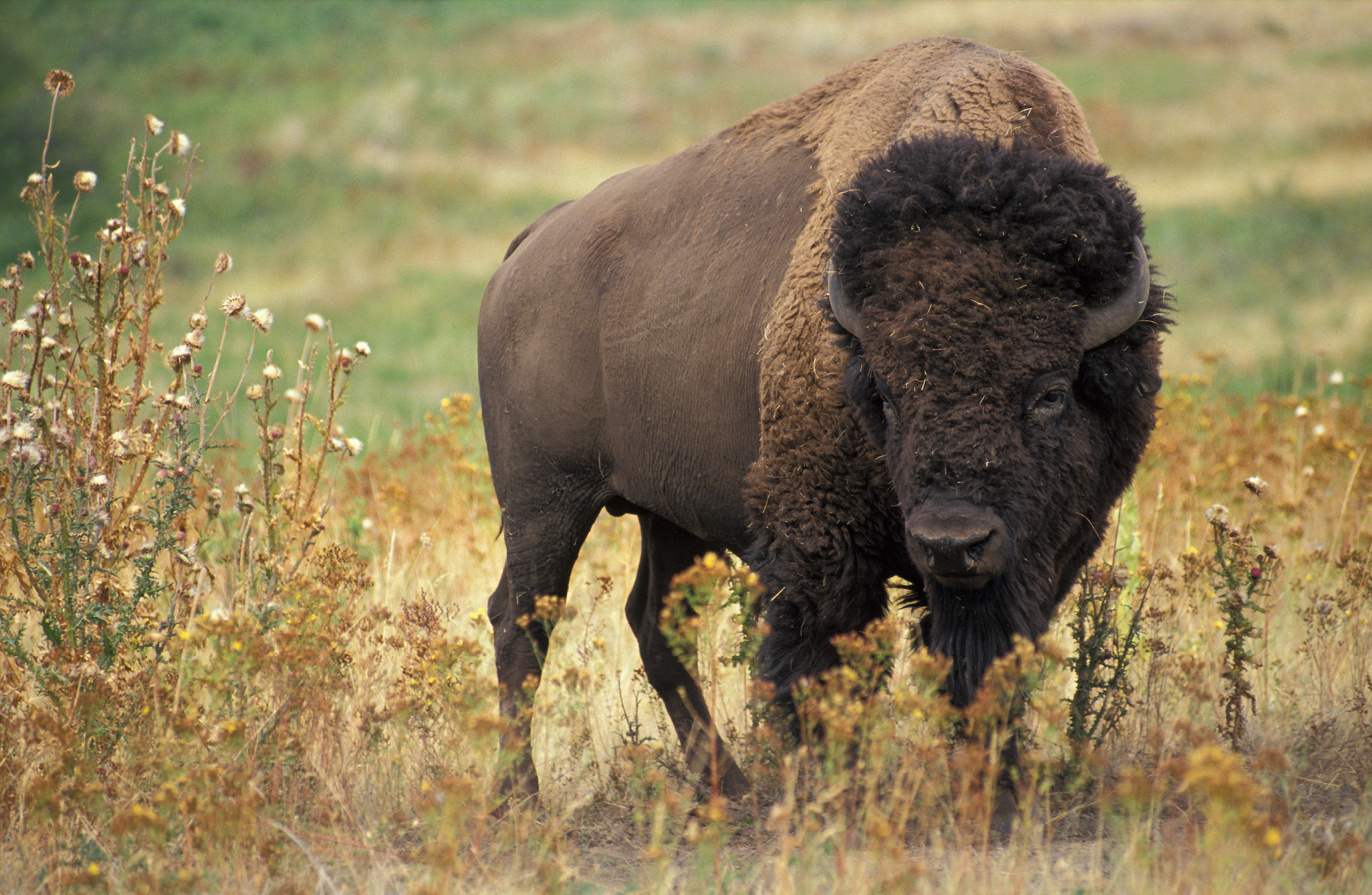
American bison, near threatened

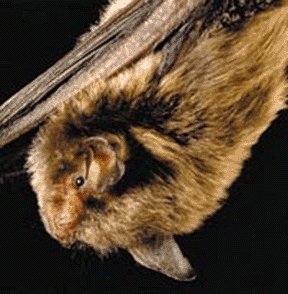
Indiana bat, near threatened

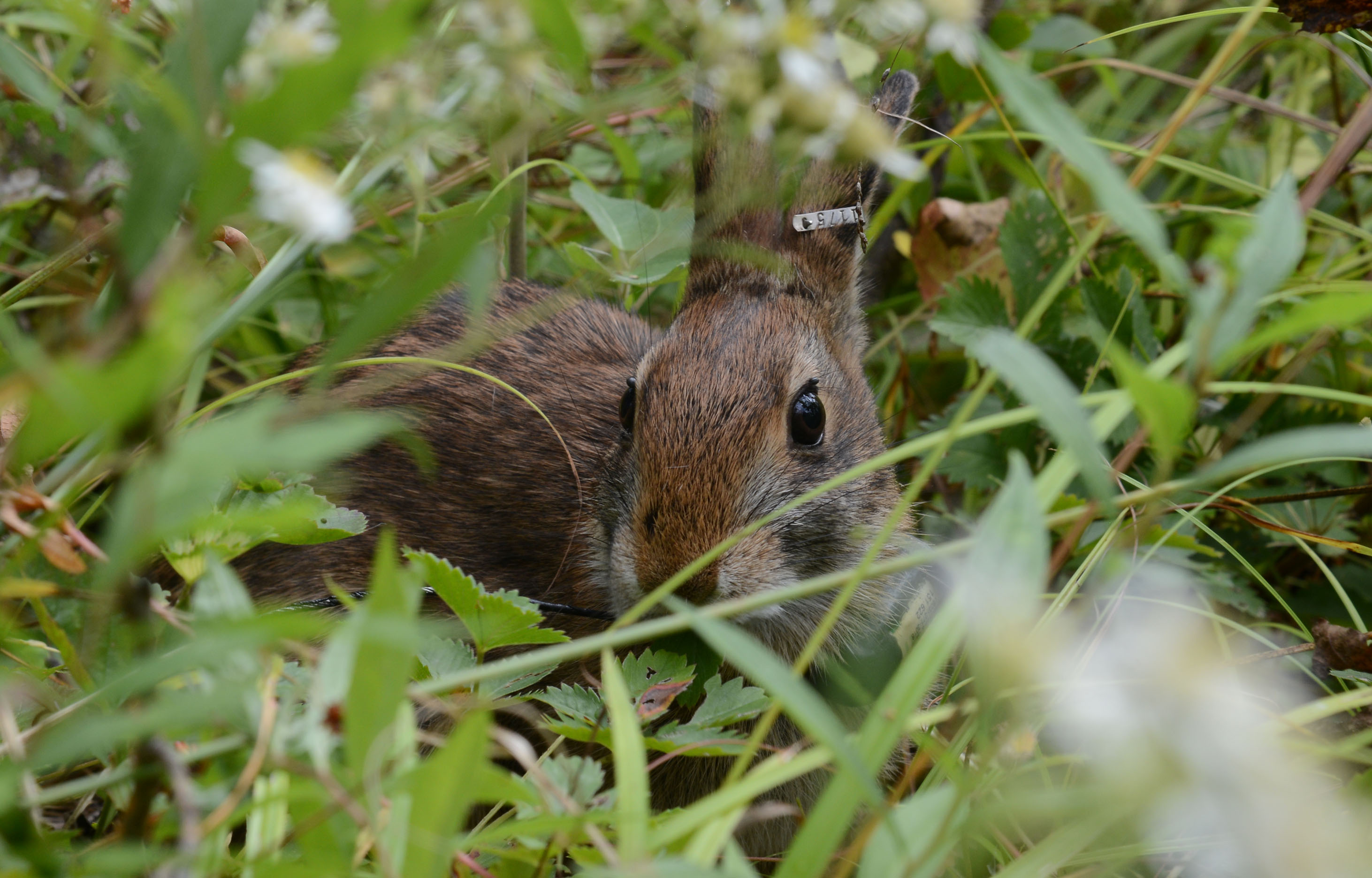
New England cottontail, vulnerable

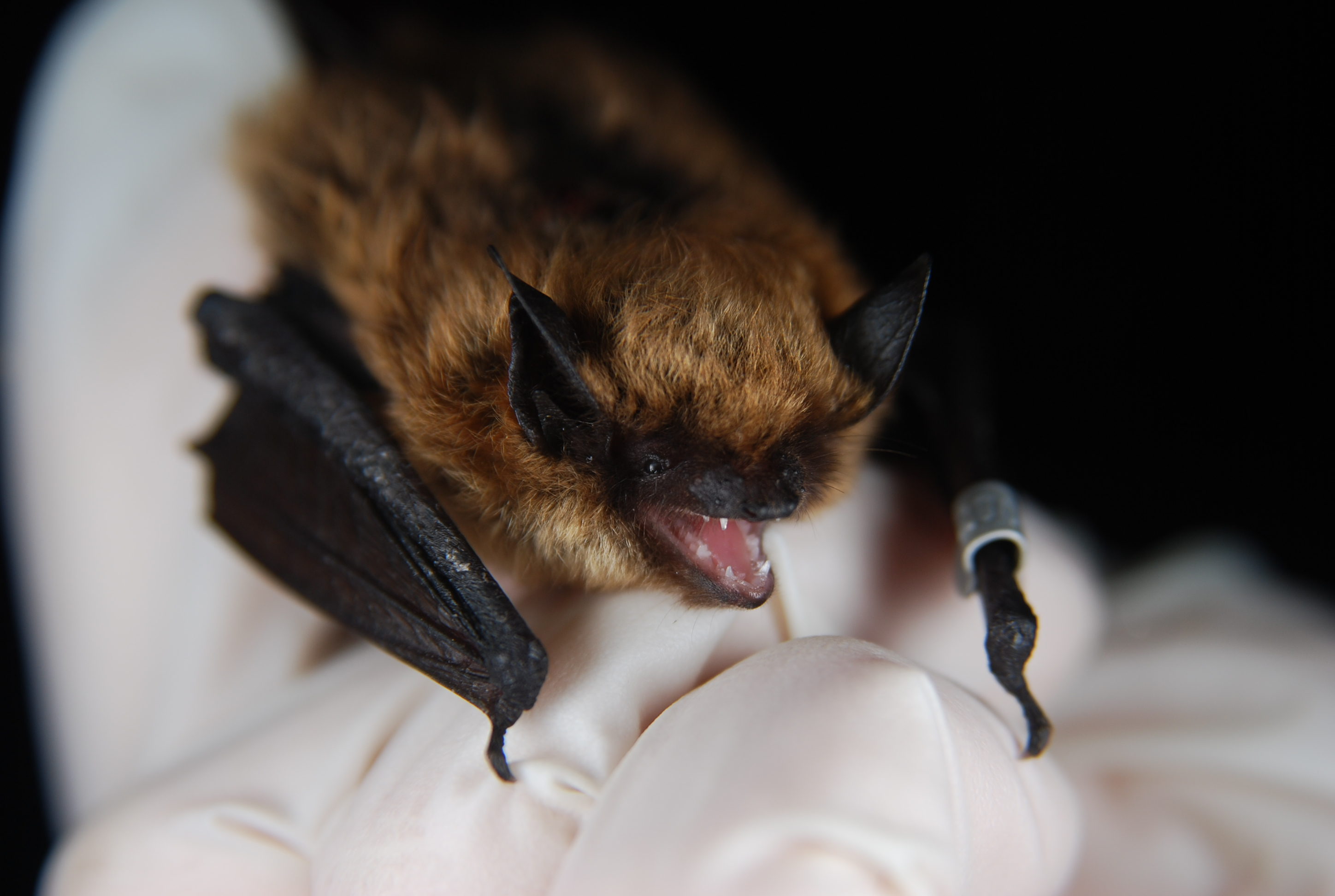
Eastern small-footed myotis, endangered

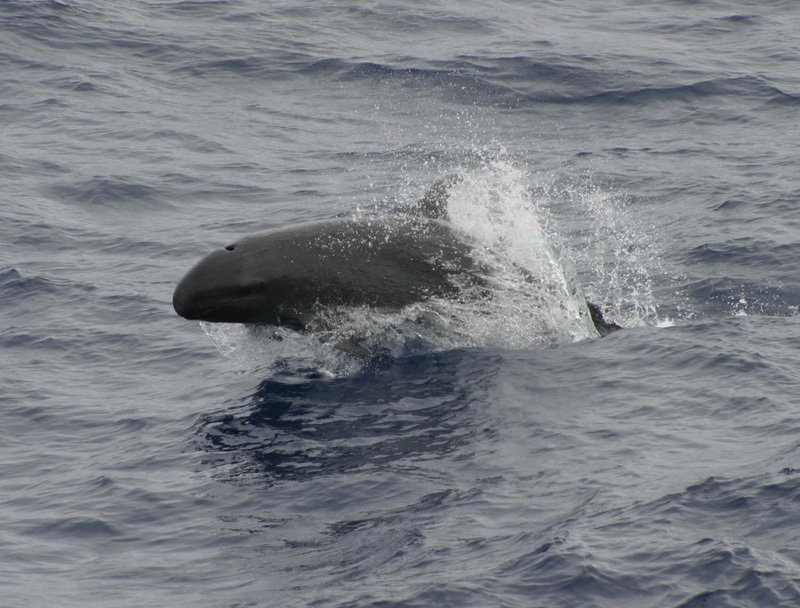
False killer whale, near threatened

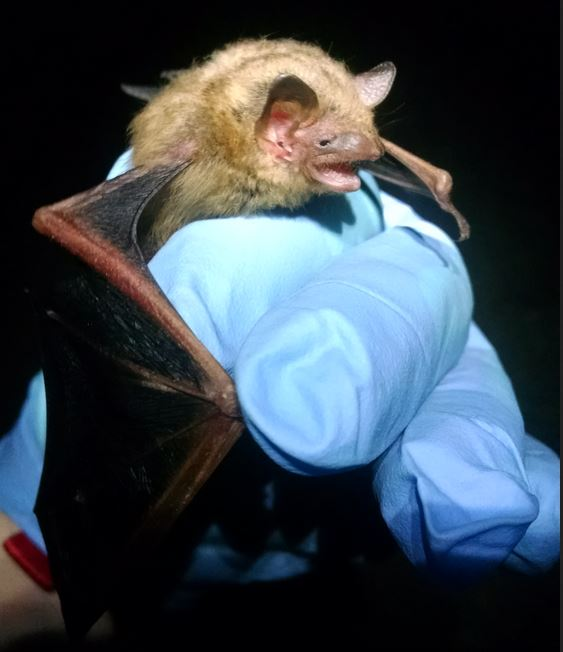
Tricolored bat, vulnerable

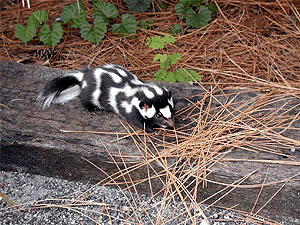
Eastern spotted skunk, vulnerable

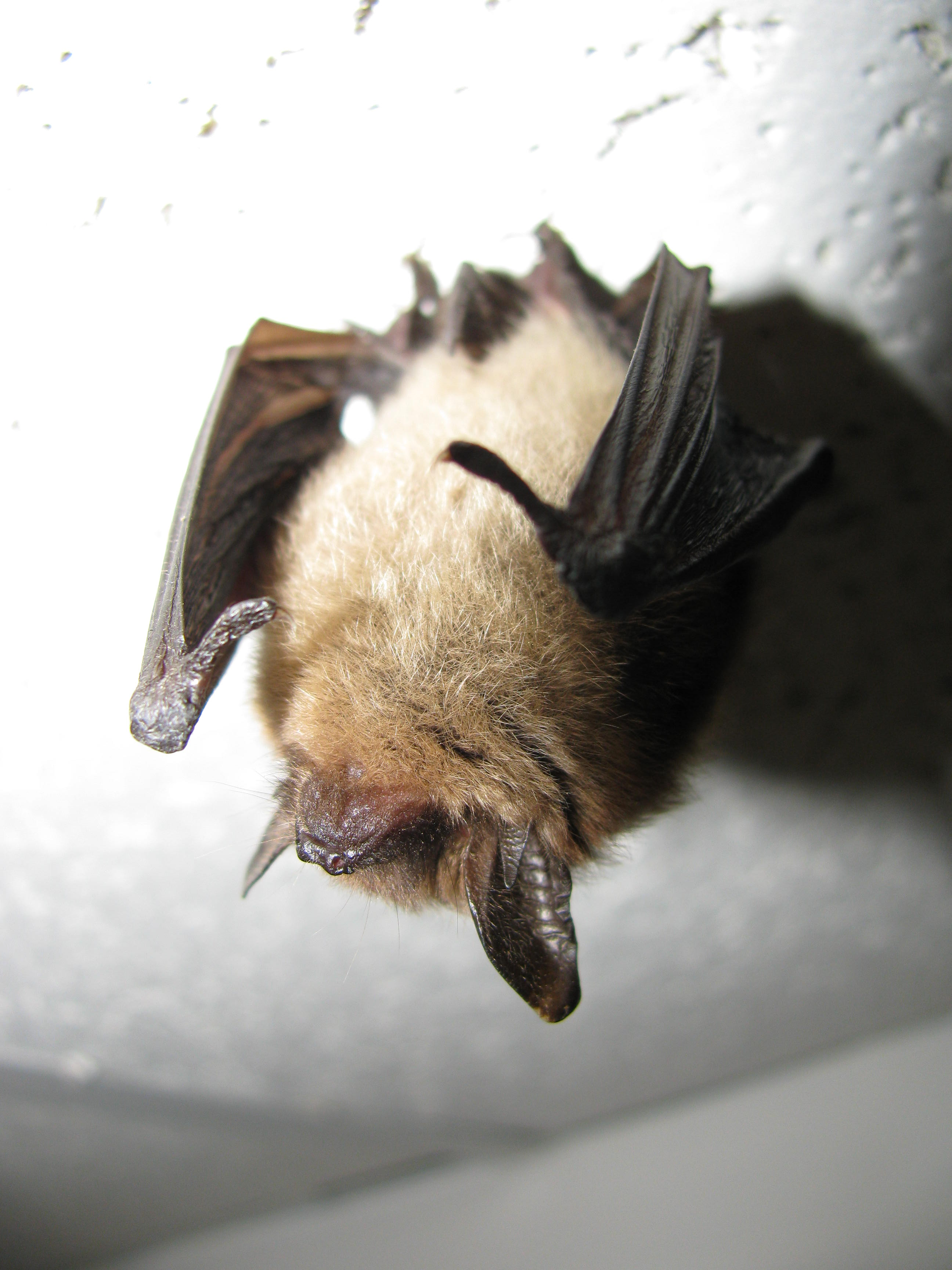
Northern long-eared bat, near threatened

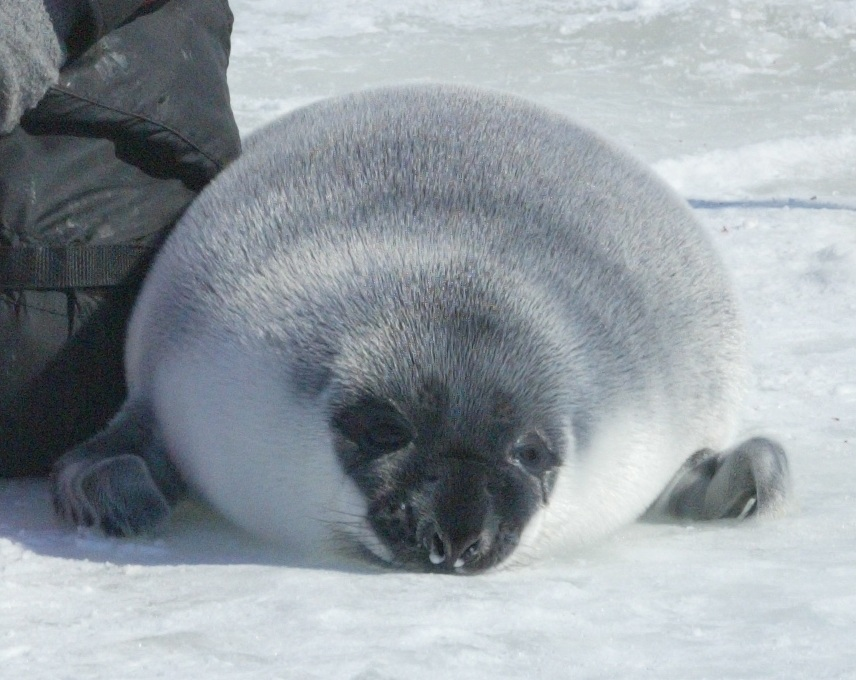
Hooded seal, vulnerable
