= List of mammals of Georgia =

List of mammals of Georgia may refer to:

- List of mammals of Georgia (country)
- List of mammals of Georgia (U.S. state)
