= Elliot's short-tailed shrew =

Conservation status
- Least Concern (IUCN 3.1)

- Secure (NatureServe)

Scientific classification
- Kingdom: Animalia
- Phylum: Chordata
- Class: Mammalia
- Order: Eulipotyphla
- Family: Soricidae
- Genus: Blarina
- Species: B. hylophaga

Binomial name
- Blarina hylophaga Elliot, 1899
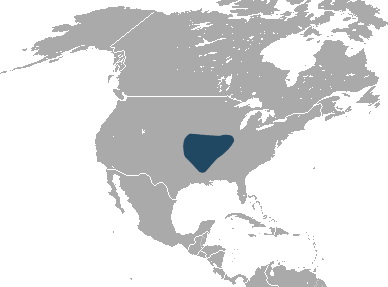
- Elliot's short-tailed shrew range

Synonyms
- Blarina carolinensis hylophaga

Species of mammal

Elliot's short-tailed shrew (Blarina hylophaga) is a small, slate grey, short-tailed species of shrew. Its common name comes from Daniel Giraud Elliot, who first described the species in 1899.

== Description ==
Elliot's short-tailed shrew is similar in appearance to the closely related southern short-tailed shrew, although slightly larger on average, and was long thought to belong to the same species. It is a heavily built shrew with short legs and tail, and a long, pointed snout with long whiskers. The ears and eyes are both small, the eyelids being permanently closed in some individuals, a feature otherwise unknown among shrews.

The fur is velvety in texture, and uniformly colored greyish to brown. Adults range from 9 to 12 cm (3.5 to 4.7 in) in total length, including the 2-to-3 cm (0.79-to-1.18 in) tail, and weigh 13 to 16 g (0.46 to 0.56 oz).

== Distribution and habitat ==
Elliot's short-tailed shrew is found in lowland environments with heavy vegetation from southern Iowa and Nebraska in the north to parts of Texas and northern Louisiana in the south, including much of the states of Missouri, Kansas, Oklahoma, and Arkansas, and the northeastern corner of Colorado. Two subspecies are currently recognised:

- Blarina hylophaga hylophaga - throughout most of range
- Blarina hylophaga plumbea - Texas

The species inhabits a diverse range of habitats, including grasslands, agricultural land, and woodland. Although it generally prefers well watered environments with plenty of ground litter, it is also known from relatively dry and sandy terrain in Texas and Colorado, often with minimal ground cover.

== Behavior and diet ==
Like other shrews, this species is insectivorous, its diet consisting primarily of beetles and slugs, along with other insects, spiders, and earthworms. They may also eat a small quantity of plants and fungi, and have been reported to eat North American deermice on occasion. Predators include owls, hawks, snakes, and swift foxes.

Elliot's short-tailed shrew is generally a solitary, nocturnal animal, spending the day sleeping in burrows in soft soil or leaf litter. The burrows may contain nests made from grass or leaves, and are surrounded by a network of trackways that the shrew uses while hunting for prey. They have been reported to travel across home ranges of anything from 0.06 to 0.55 hectares (0.15 to 1.36 acres), and to travel mostly around dawn and sunset. Having poor eyesight, they hunt primarily by means of echolocation. They are active throughout the year, and do not hibernate.

== Reproduction ==
The shrew breeds from early spring to late summer, and may be able to raise two or three litters per in a year. Gestation lasts 21 or 22 days, and results in the birth of four to seven hairless young. The young are weaned, with a full coat of fuzzy hair, by one month of age, not receiving the adult coat until they have reached adult size. Individuals can live for up to two years.

== Taxonomy and evolution ==
Elliot's short-tailed shrew was originally described as a subspecies of Blarina brevicauda, and was only identified as a separate species in 1981. Genetic analysis to determine its precise relationship to other members of the genus has been ambiguous, with some studies placing it as the closest relative to the southern short-tailed shrew, and others showing it as being basal to the other species. The oldest fossils of the species date from the last Ice Age, and the two subspecies may have diverged as recently as one thousand years ago.
