= Tamias striatus doorsiensis =

Conservation status
- Least Concern (IUCN 3.1)

Scientific classification
- Domain: Eukaryota
- Kingdom: Animalia
- Phylum: Chordata
- Class: Mammalia
- Order: Rodentia
- Family: Sciuridae
- Genus: Tamias
- Species: T. striatus
- Subspecies: T. s. doorsiensis

Trinomial name
- Tamias striatus doorsiensis Long, 1971

Subspecies of rodent

Tamias striatus doorsiensis is a subspecies of the eastern chipmunk that is only found in Door, Kewaunee, northeastern Brown, and possibly Manitowoc counties in northeastern Wisconsin. It was described by C. A. Long in 1971. Compared to the other subspecies of eastern chipmunk present in nearby in Michigan and Wisconsin, they have brighter patches behind their ears, grayer hair along their backs, and more white on their tails. It is smaller than T. s. griseus but larger than the least chipmunk (Neotamias minimus).

== Distribution ==
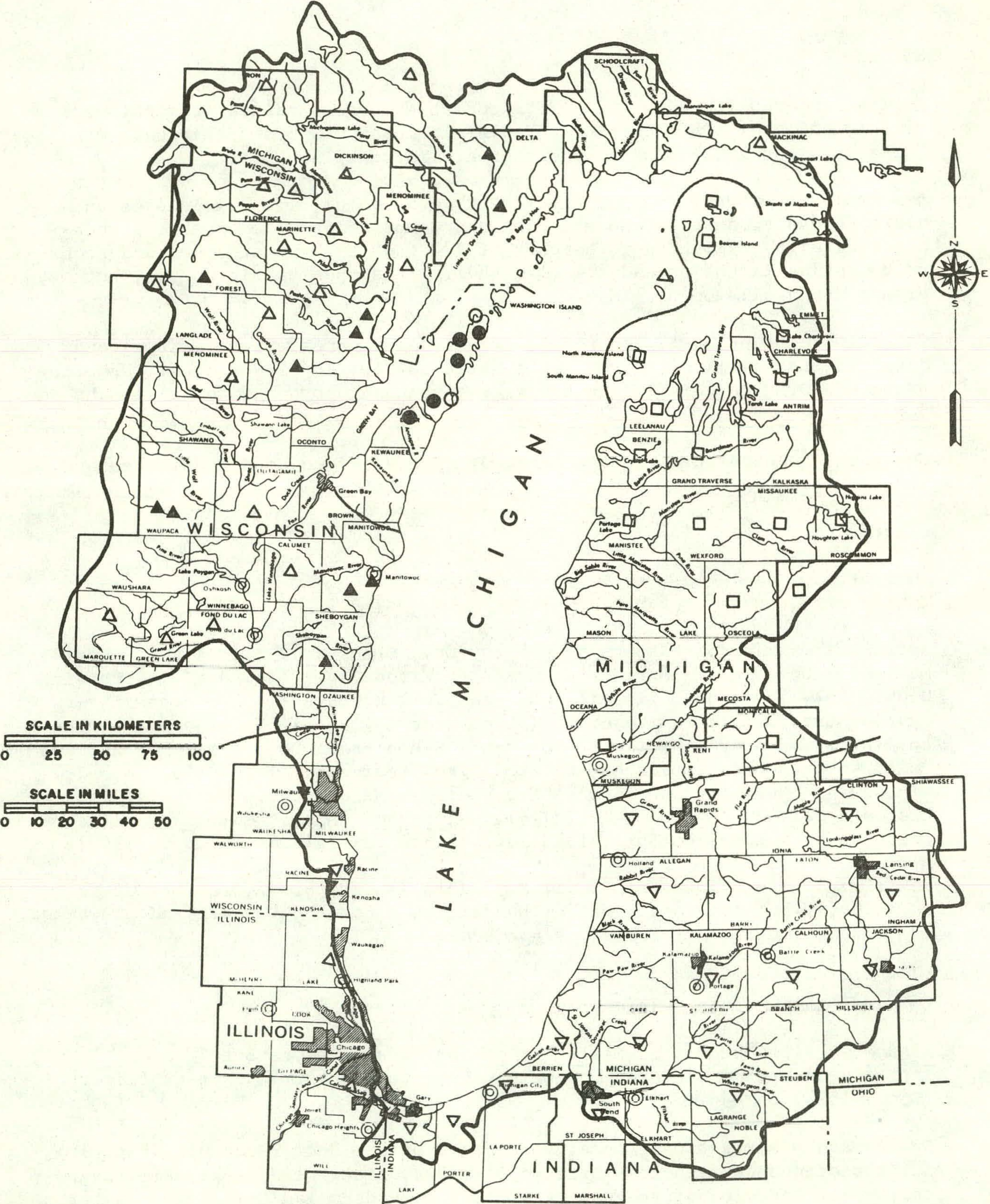
Distribution of Tamias striatus subspecies in the Door Peninsula vicinity: T. s. griseus (triangles), T. s. doorsiensis (circles), and T. s. peninsulae (squares). The black symbols mark where collected specimens were taken from, while the open symbols refer to other records.
