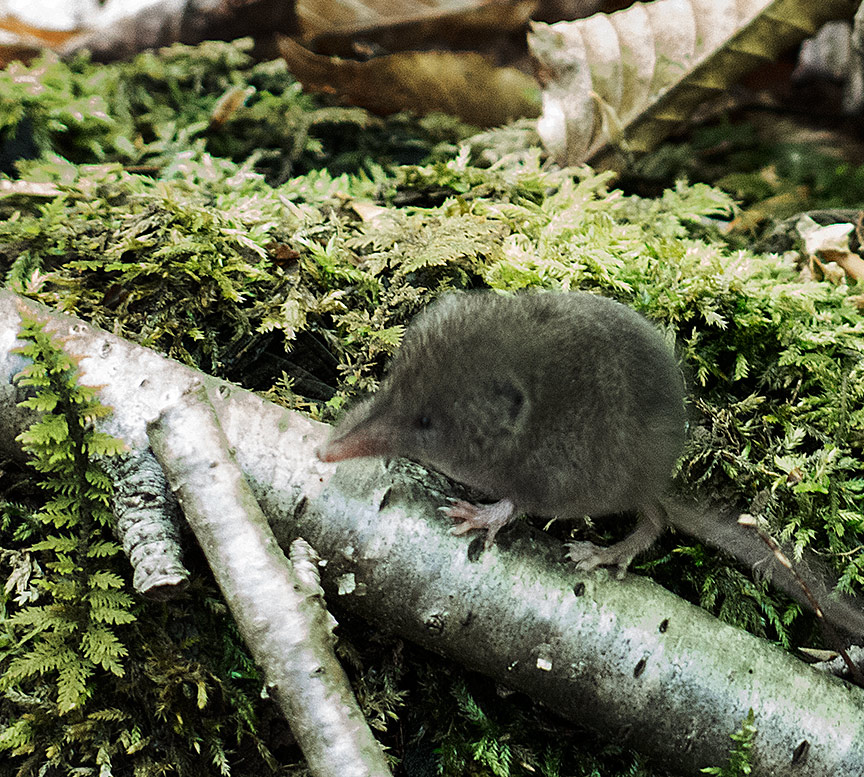
- North American least shrew of the Blarinini Tribe

Scientific classification
- Kingdom: Animalia
- Phylum: Chordata
- Class: Mammalia
- Order: Eulipotyphla
- Family: Soricidae
- Subfamily: Soricinae
- Tribe: Blarinini; Kretzoi, 1965

Genera
- †Adeloblarina; Blarina; †Blarinoides; Cryptotis; †Mafia; †Paracryptotis; †Peisorex; †Shikamainosorex; †Sulimskia; †Tregosorex

= Blarinini =

Tribe of mammals

Blarinini is a tribe of shrews of the subfamily Soricinae. The tribe contains ten genera, of which only Blarina and Cryptotis still exist today.
