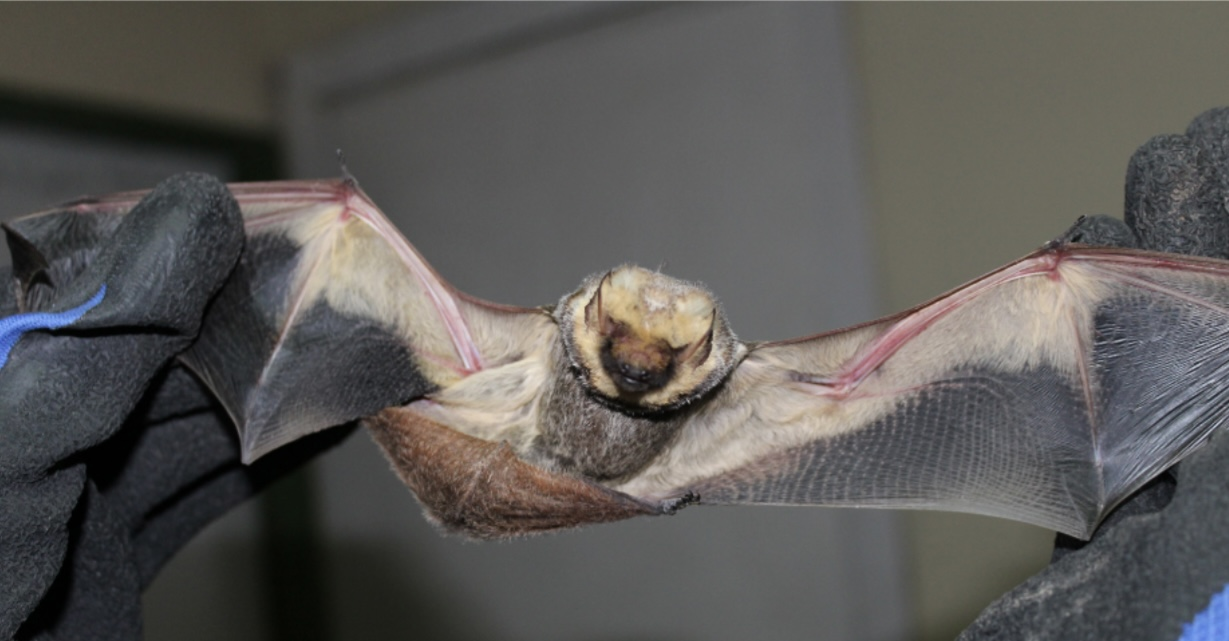

Scientific classification
- Kingdom: Animalia
- Phylum: Chordata
- Class: Mammalia
- Infraclass: Placentalia
- Order: Chiroptera
- Family: Vespertilionidae
- Genus: Lasiurus
- Species: L. villosissimus

Binomial name
- Lasiurus villosissimus (Geoffroy St.-Hilaire, 1806)

Synonyms
- Vespertilio villosissimus Geoffroy St.-Hilaire, 1806; Aeorestes cinereus villosissimus (Geoffroy St.-Hilaire, 1806); Lasiurus cinereus villosissimus (Geoffroy St.-Hilaire, 1806)

= South American hoary bat =

South American bat species

The South American hoary bat (Lasiurus villosissimus) is a species of vesper bat found in South America.

== Taxonomy ==
Prior to 2015, the South American hoary bat was recognized as a subspecies of the hoary bat, A. cinereus.

== Range ==
The South American hoary bat is found in the following South American countries: Peru, Bolivia, Paraguay, Uruguay, Brazil, and Argentina.
