= Everglades short-tailed shrew =

Scientific classification
- Kingdom: Animalia
- Phylum: Chordata
- Class: Mammalia
- Infraclass: Placentalia
- Order: Eulipotyphla
- Family: Soricidae
- Genus: Blarina
- Species: B. peninsulae

Binomial name
- Blarina peninsulae Merriam, 1895

Species of mammal

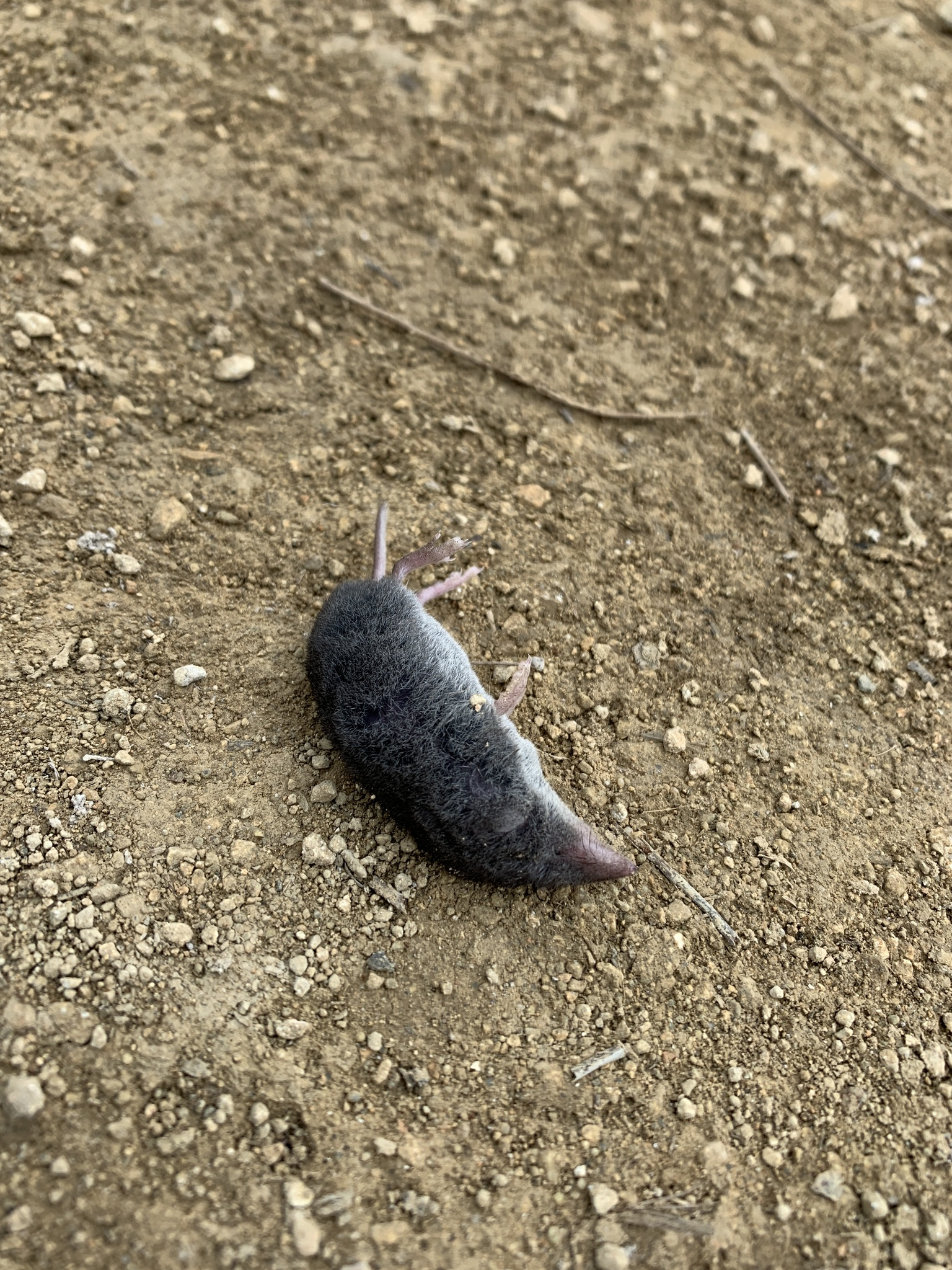
Blarina peninsulae

The Everglades short-tailed shrew (Blarina peninsulae) is a species of shrew in the genus Blarina. It is endemic to Florida.
