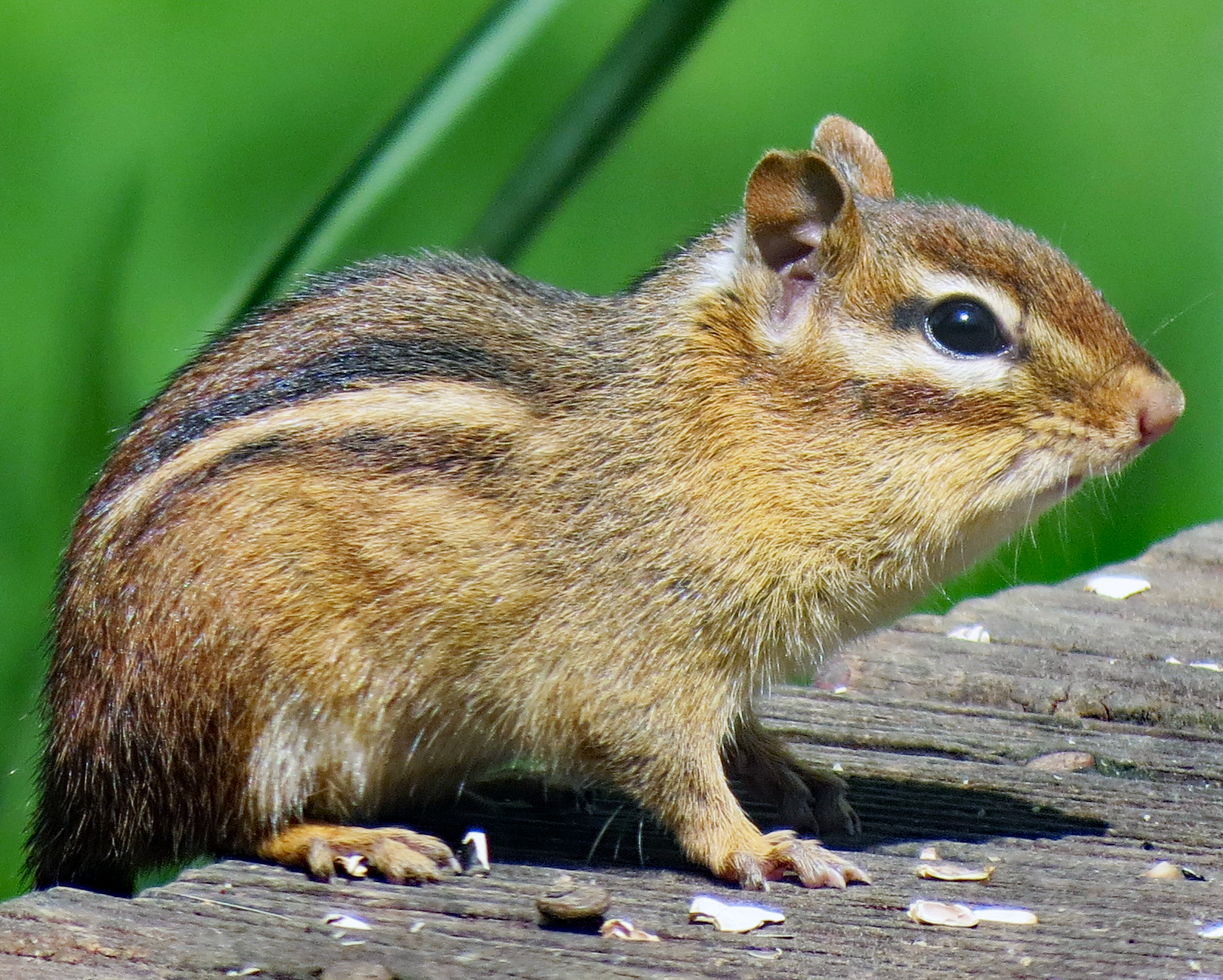
- An individual spotted near Newark, Ohio

Scientific classification
- Kingdom: Animalia
- Phylum: Chordata
- Class: Mammalia
- Order: Rodentia
- Family: Sciuridae
- Genus: Tamias
- Species: T. striatus
- Subspecies: T. s. ohioensis

Trinomial name
- Tamias striatus ohioensis Bole ex Moulthrop, 1942

= Ohio chipmunk =

Subspecies of rodent

The Ohio chipmunk (Tamias striatus ohioensis), also known as the Ohioan chipmunk, or the Ohio eastern chipmunk, is a subspecies of the eastern chipmunk that is native to parts of Wisconsin, Illinois, Indiana, Michigan, Kentucky, and Ohio, with some populations potentially present in far north-eastern to western Pennsylvania, and very rarely into West Virginia. It was described by Patterson Bole and Philip Moulthrop in 1942. The subspecies has a very similar coloration, and appearance to that of other subspecies.
