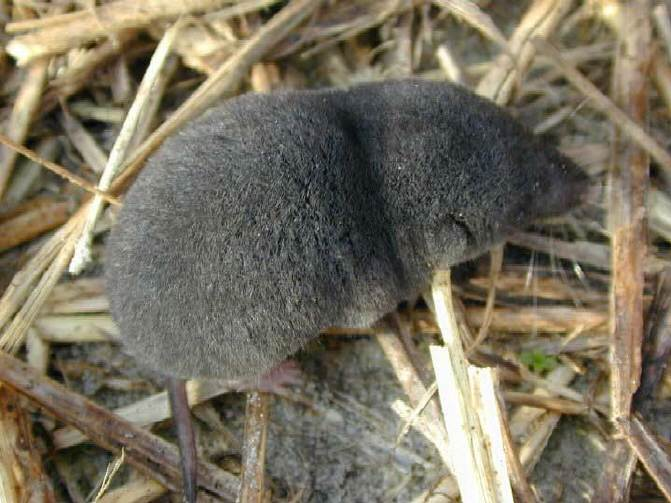
- Southern short-tailed shrew (Blarina carolinensis)

Scientific classification
- Domain: Eukaryota
- Kingdom: Animalia
- Phylum: Chordata
- Class: Mammalia
- Order: Eulipotyphla
- Family: Soricidae
- Tribe: Blarinini
- Genus: Blarina; Gray, 1838

Type species
- Corsira (Blarina) talpoides

Species
- B. brevicauda; B. carolinensis; B. hylophaga; B. peninsulae; B. shermani

= Blarina =

American short-tailed shrews Temporal range: Late Pliocene to Recent

Genus of mammals

The genus Blarina, commonly called short-tailed shrews, is a genus of relatively large shrews with relatively short tails found in North America.

== Description ==
They have 32 teeth and are in the red-toothed shrew subfamily. They generally have dark fur and thick feet. The saliva of these animals is toxic and is used to subdue prey.

== Species ==
Species are:

- Northern short-tailed shrew B. brevicauda
- Southern short-tailed shrew B. carolinensis
- Elliot's short-tailed shrew B. hylophaga
- Everglades short-tailed shrew B. peninsulae
- Sherman's short-tailed shrew B. shermani; possibly extinct

== Ecoepidemiology ==
Short-tailed shrews are one of the animal reservoirs of the agents of Lyme disease and human babesiosis.
