= Northern long-eared bat =

Northern long-eared bat is a common name for several flying mammals, species of Chiroptera

- Myotis septentrionalis, a North American bat, also known as the northern myotis
- Nyctophilus arnhemensis, an Australasian bat
- Nyctophilus daedalus, another Australasian bat
