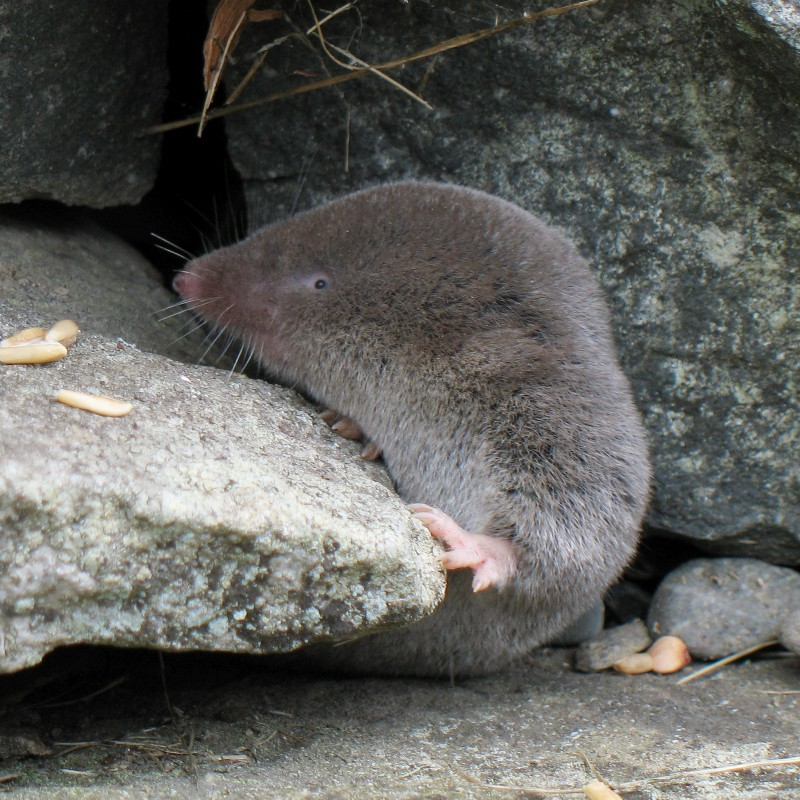

Conservation status
- Least Concern (IUCN 3.1)

Scientific classification
- Kingdom: Animalia
- Phylum: Chordata
- Class: Mammalia
- Order: Eulipotyphla
- Family: Soricidae
- Genus: Blarina
- Species: B. brevicauda

Binomial name
- Blarina brevicauda (Say, 1823)
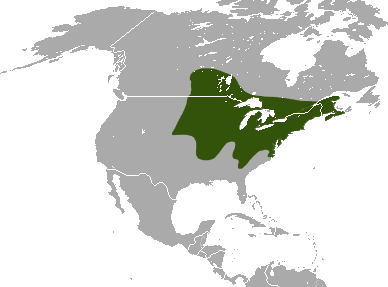

= Northern short-tailed shrew =

Species of mammal

The northern short-tailed shrew (Blarina brevicauda) is the largest shrew in the genus Blarina, and occurs in the northeastern region of North America. It is a semifossorial, highly active, and voracious insectivore and is present in a variety of habitats like broadleaved and pine forests among shrubs and hedges as well as grassy river banks. It is notable in that it is one of the few venomous mammals. The specific epithet, brevicauda, is a combination of the Latin brevis and cauda, meaning "short tail".

== Taxonomy ==
B. brevicauda is a red-toothed shrew, one of three or four species (depending on the authority) in the genus Blarina. It was formerly considered to be a sister subspecies of the southern short-tailed shrew (B. carolinensis). The species has been divided into 11 subspecies based on morphological characteristics, which are grouped into two semispecies: B. b. brevicauda and B. b. talpoides; these groupings were mirrored by a molecular systematics study of the mitochondrial cytochrome b sequence. The two groups of subspecies are thought to have been kept isolated from each other by Pleistocene glaciers.

== Description ==
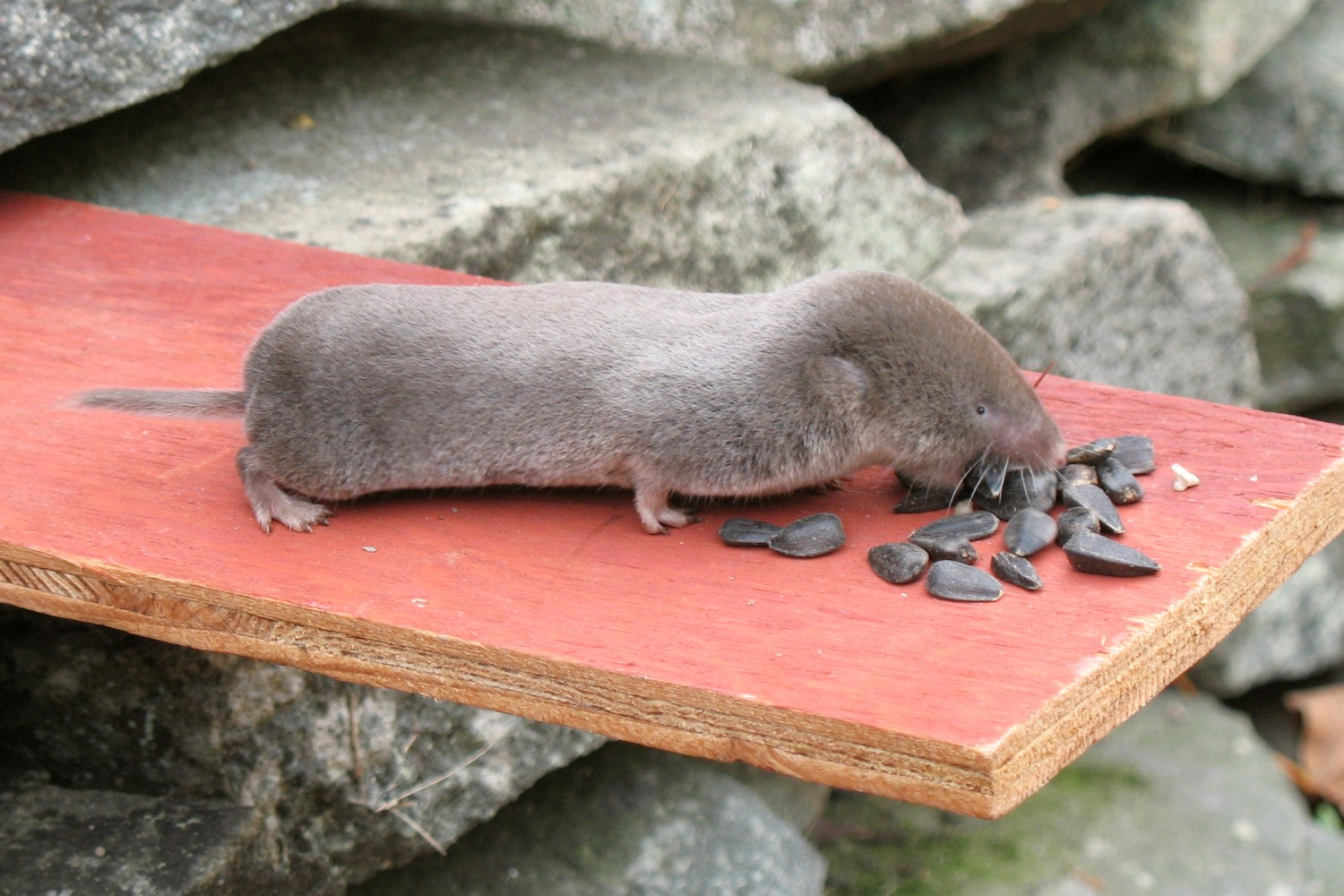
Northern short-tailed shrew

This shrew has a total length of 108 to 140 mm (4.3 to 5.5 in), of which 18 to 32 mm (0.71 to 1.26 in) is tail; and weighs 15 to 30 g (0.53 to 1.06 oz). The species exhibits slight sexual dimorphism in size, with the male being slightly larger than the female. The dorsal fur is thick and velvety, and can be black, brownish black, or silvery gray, with the ventral fur being a bit lighter and grayer. The shrew molts from a summer coat which is shorter and paler than the winter pelage in October and November, and back again sometime in February through July. The tail is quite short, amounting to less than 25% of the total length. The dental formula is I 3-3/1-1, C 1-1/1-1, P 3-3/1-1, M 3-3/3-3 = 16/16 = 32. Three well-developed scent glands are present, one on each side of the animal and one ventral; the scent may be used for marking territories, though the shrew's sense of smell is thought to be poor.

== Distribution ==
=== Fossil record ===
Most records of B. brevicauda are from the Pleistocene, though one record from the late Pliocene (Blancan land mammal age) is tentatively attributed to this species. Another source indicates the earliest record of the genus Blarina is a specimen of B. b. talpoides, from the Blancan (early Pleistocene) in Kansas. The species is thought to have arisen in the middle or late Pliocene. The B. b. brevicauda subspecies appeared later.

=== Range ===
This shrew is found throughout central and eastern North America, from southern Saskatchewan to Atlantic Canada and south to northern Arkansas and Georgia. It is probably the most common shrew in the Great Lakes region. Population densities usually range from five to 30 shrews per hectare (two to 12 per acre), but rarely exceed 200/ha (80/ac). The typical home range of a shrew is 2.5 ha, and may overlap slightly with the ranges of other shrews.

=== Habitat ===
Both disturbed and undisturbed habitats are used by the northern short-tailed shrew, including grasslands, old fields, fencerows, marshy areas, deciduous and coniferous forests, and household gardens, though the preferred habitats are those which are moist with leaf litter or thick plant cover. Burned-over forests are not quickly recolonized by B. brevicauda, and shrews quickly depart clear-cuts.

== Diet ==
This shrew consumes up to three times its weight in food each day. It eats small quantities of subterranean fungi and seeds, though it is mostly carnivorous. It prefers insects (such as beetles), earthworms, voles, snails, and other shrews for the bulk of its diet, though salamanders, frogs, snakes, birds, and mice are also eaten. This shrew consumes vertebrates more often than other shrews do. The shrew mostly forages within a few hours after sunset, though it is also active during cloudy days. High evaporative water loss requires the shrew to have access to a source of water, though it does obtain water from its food, as well. The shrew often hoards food, especially in the fall and winter, or during a time of prey abundance; one study found it caches 87% of the prey it catches, while 9% is eaten immediately and 4% is left where it was killed.

=== Toxin ===
The saliva of the northern short-tailed shrew contains a kallikrein-like protease, used to paralyze and subdue its prey. The toxin is strong enough to kill small animals, up to sizes somewhat larger than the shrew itself, and results in painful bites to humans who attempt to handle the shrew. The venomous saliva is secreted from submaxillary glands, through a duct which opens at the base of the lower incisors, where the saliva flows along the groove formed by the two incisors, and into the prey. The toxin is very similar in structure to the one produced by the Mexican beaded lizard (Heloderma horridum) which independently developed its toxin from the same precursor protein.

== Epidemiology ==
Northern short-tailed shrews in Alabama have been identified as carriers of the newly-discovered Camp Hill virus that is not known to cause disease but which is distantly related to Nipah virus. "Researchers at an Auburn University lab collected" the shrew, according to a news report, "that was found with a new species of henipavirus named after the Alabama town where the specimen came from". The research letter appeared in a scholarly publication, but was not peer reviewed.

== Physiology ==
=== Senses ===
Their sense of smell is thought to be poor, and their eyes are degenerated and vision is thought to be limited to the detection of light, but the shrew compensates by using echolocation and a fine sense of touch.

=== Energetics ===
Its ability to consume almost anything it can catch allows the northern short-tailed shrew to survive the cold winters of temperate regions. The thermoneutral zone of this species is from 25 to 33 °C, meaning no extra energy must be expended by the animal to maintain its body temperature (which averages 38.0–38.5 °C) when the ambient temperature is within this range. Food consumption is 43% higher in winter than in summer, as the shrew must increase its metabolic rate to maintain its body temperature under the cold conditions. Temperatures at or above 35 °C are lethal for this shrew. A study of captive shrews found, though they were primarily nocturnal, the degree of nocturnality changed with the season; that is, during the colder winter, the shrews exhibited more out-of-burrow activity earlier in the evening, but were active later in the night during the summer. This seasonal pattern was due to solar radiation and changing daily temperatures, and it allows the shrews to minimize the energy needed for thermoregulation. Other winter adaptations include the creation of a lined nest which aids the shrew in conserving heat, the caching of food in case of prey shortages, foraging below the leaf litter or snow where the temperature is milder, and decreasing activity levels during cold periods. Along with these behavioral adaptations, the northern short-tailed shrew increases its ability to generate body heat during the winter by nonshivering thermogenesis in brown adipose tissue.

== Behavior ==
Other shrews spend more time above ground than does the northern short-tailed shrew, which prefers to tunnel along below ground, through the leaf litter, or at the snow/ground interface. Bouts of frenzied activity, lasting around five minutes, are followed by longer periods of resting, with the total active time amounting to only 16% of a 24-hour day. This animal is capable of digging at a rate of 2.5 cm/min, in between resting.

The shrew constructs a nest up to 20 cm (8 in) in diameter underground or underneath a log, and lines it with leaves or the fur of the meadow vole (Microtus pennsylvanicus). This nest is kept clean, with wastes deposited outside the nest in a latrine area. Other parts of the burrow system are used for food storage.

Typically solitary, B. brevicauda exhibits several aggressive displays and vocalizations to ward off other members of the species when encounters occur. Pairs of shrews which were introduced to a cage simultaneously coexisted for less than four months before one killed the other, and a new shrew placed in a cage containing an already established shrew will be killed within a few hours.

== Reproduction ==
Mating occurs from March through September, though most births occur early or late in that period. Male shrews in captivity were observed to make clicking sounds while courting a female. During copulation, the male and female are locked together, and the female drags the male along with her. Gestation lasts 21–24 days, and after birth, the six to eight young are suckled for up to 25 days before the babies are weaned. Two litters per season are typical, though three are possible. The female strengthens the nest when the young are nursing, and is more active to support her increased nutritional needs. The young, which were born hairless and blind and weighing less than a gram, may become sexually mature in as soon as 2–3 months; those born in the spring mature more quickly than those born late in the season, and may themselves reproduce in the same year they were born. The juvenile pelage is pale and quite similar to the adults' summer fur, and is molted when the young reaches adult size.

== Predation ==
The northern short-tailed shrew has a high mortality rate, though it attempts to escape predation by remaining hidden under vegetation, soil, leaf litter, or snow; only 6% of a marked group of shrews survived to the next year, and winter mortality of 90% has been recorded, probably due to cold stress. This shrew is consumed by many predators: trout, snakes, raptors, canids, cats, mustelids, skunks, raccoons, and opossums, though mammalian carnivores appear to be deterred by the musky odor produced by the shrew's scent glands.

== Conservation ==
The northern short-tailed shrew is considered a species of least concern in the IUCN Red List, as it is widespread, abundant, and its population is not declining.
