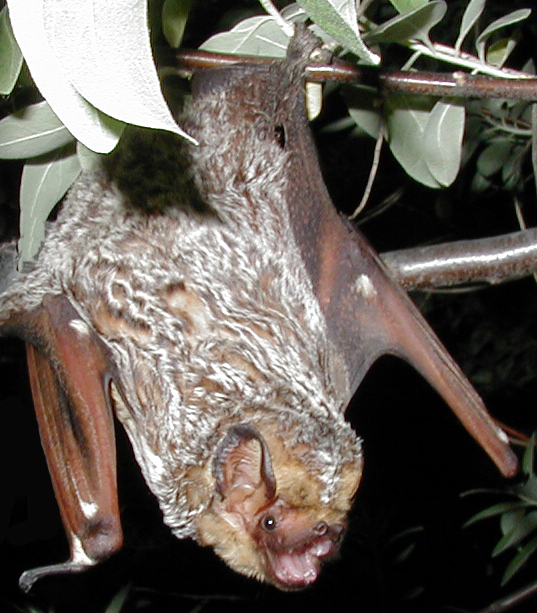

Conservation status
- Least Concern (IUCN 3.1)

Scientific classification
- Kingdom: Animalia
- Phylum: Chordata
- Class: Mammalia
- Infraclass: Placentalia
- Order: Chiroptera
- Family: Vespertilionidae
- Genus: Lasiurus
- Species: L. cinereus

Binomial name
- Lasiurus cinereus (Beauvois, 1796)
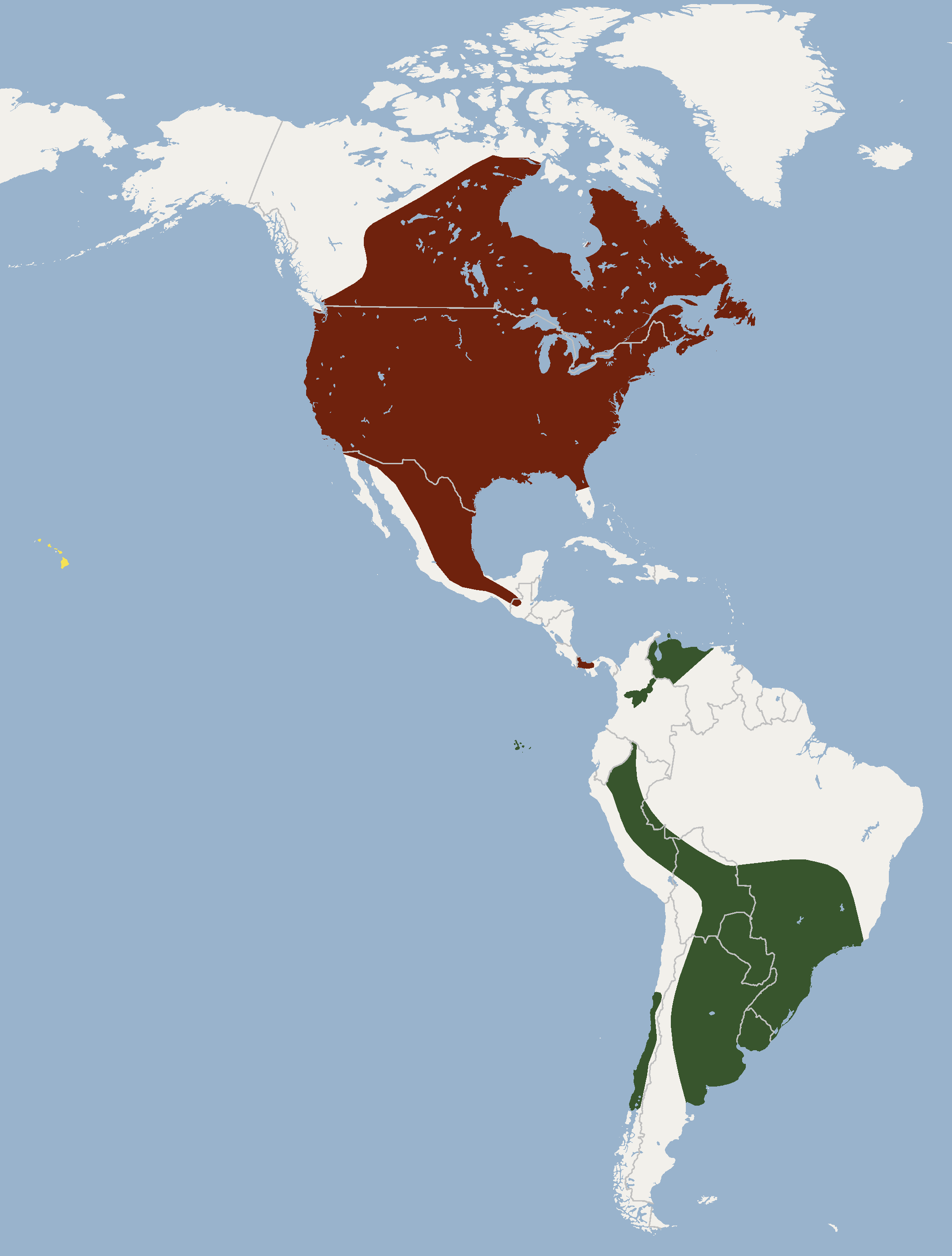
- Distribution of the hoary bat (2008)

= Hoary bat =

Species of bat

The hoary bat (Lasiurus cinereus) is a species of bat in the vesper bat family, Vespertilionidae. It lives throughout most of North America (and possibly also in Hawaii, although this is disputed).

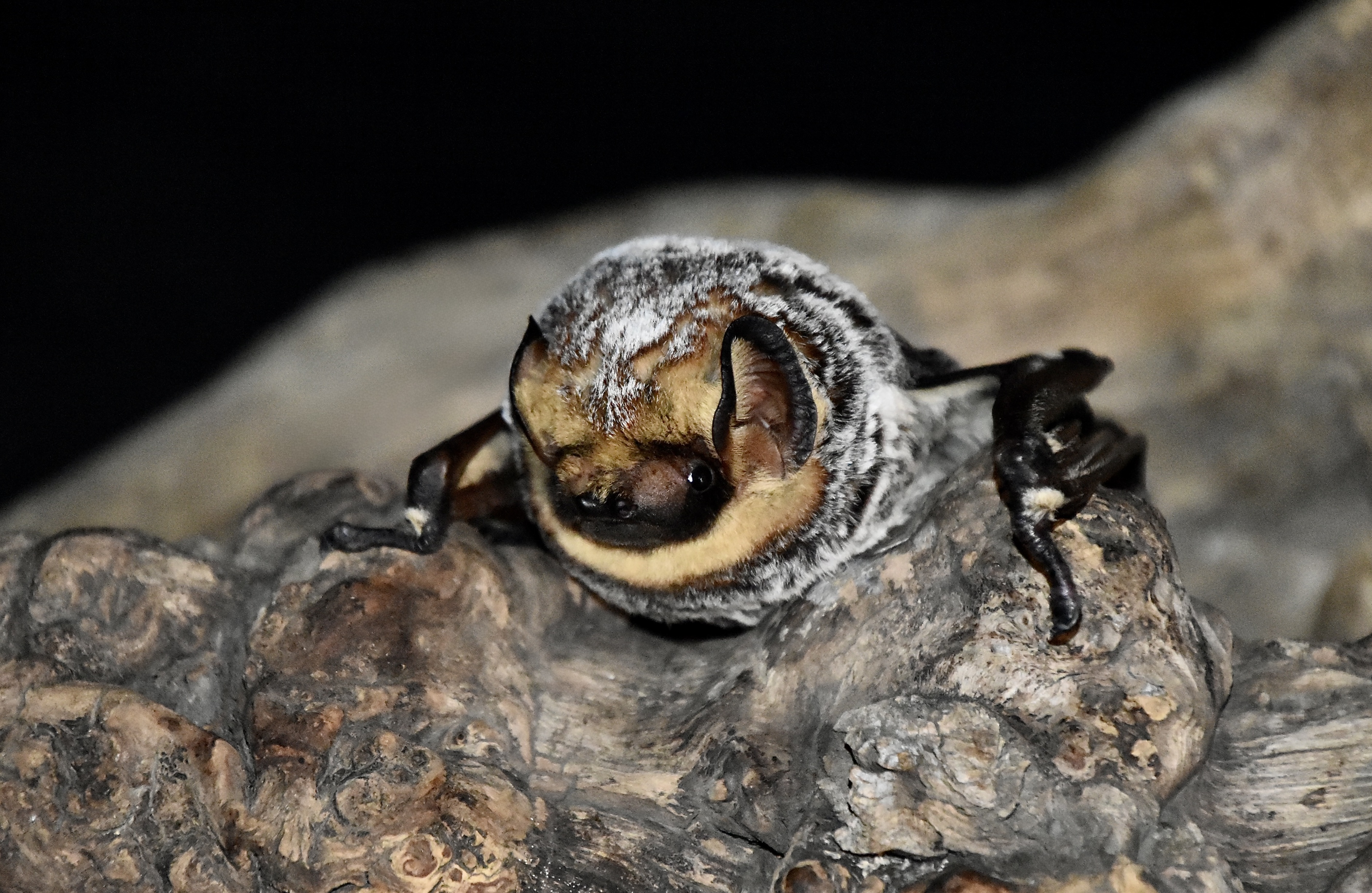
At a bat rescue center in Arizona.

== Taxonomy ==
The hoary bat was described as a new species in 1796 by Palisot de Beauvois. Beauvois noted that the holotype was collected in the US state of Pennsylvania by an individual identified as "Master Pancake". It has many taxonomic synonyms, including Vespertilio pruinosis (Say, 1823) and Atalpha mexicana (Saussure, 1861). Mammalogist Harrison Allen was the first to use its current name combination of Lasiurus cinereus, doing so in 1864. In a later publication, Allen placed it in the now-defunct genus Atalapha, with a scientific name of Atalpha cinerea.

The South American hoary bat (L. villosissimus), which is found throughout South America, and the Hawaiian hoary bat (L. semotus), which is endemic to Hawaii, were both previously classified under the hoary bat, but phylogenetic evidence supports them being distinct species.

Some have argued to elevate the subgenus (Aeorestes) to a genus level classification for L. cinereus. However, this has not been accepted by taxonomic authorities as it violates the International Code of Zoological Nomenclature

== Distribution ==
It ranges throughout North America, from northern Canada south to Guatemala. Although the Hawaiian subspecies L. semotus was reclassified into a distinct species, studies in 2015 and 2017 found evidence supporting two different colonization events of Hawaii by Lasiurus species; one about 1.4 million years ago by the ancestors of L. semotus, but also a much more recent colonization by true L. cinereus. This would mean that L. cinereus also inhabits the Hawaiian islands, in cryptic sympatry with L. semotus. However, in contrast, a 2020 genetic study found no evidence of multiple bat species on Hawaii, finding the islands to only be inhabited by a single species, L. semotus, and attributed the previous results as a consequence of incomplete lineage sorting.

== Description ==
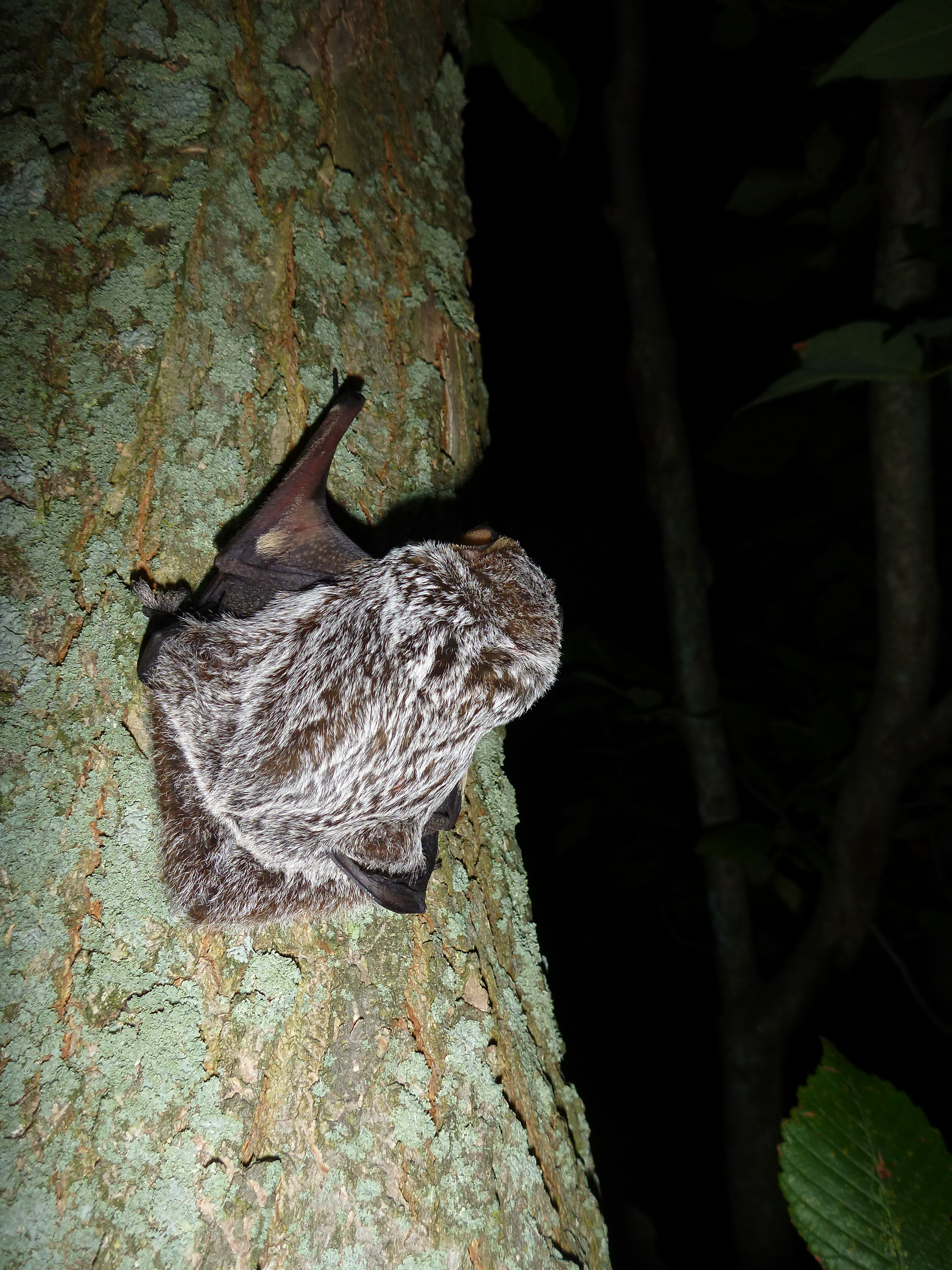
Juvenile male hoary bat on a tree, frosted "hoary" dorsal coloration visible

The hoary bat averages 13 to 14.5 cm (5.1 to 5.7 in) long with a 40 cm (15.5 in) wingspan and a weight of 26 g (0.92 oz). It is the largest bat normally found in Canada. Its coat is dense and dark brown, with white tips to the hairs that give the species its 'hoary' appearance for which it is named. The body is covered in fur except for the undersides of the wings. Males and females are dimorphic in body mass, with females 40% heavier than males.

== Behavior ==
The bat normally roosts alone on trees, hidden in the foliage, but on occasion has been seen in caves with other bats. It prefers woodland, mainly coniferous forests, but hunts over open areas or lakes. It hunts alone and its main food source is moths. The bats can cover an impressive 39 km (24 mi) while foraging. Hoary bats are long-distance migrants, spending the winter in Central America and the southwestern United States and the spring and summer in more northern latitudes in the United States and Canada.

== Reproduction ==
The reproductive cycle of the hoary bat is not yet fully documented, but it is thought that they mate in August with birth occurring in June of the following year. It is thought that the gestation period is only 40 days and that mammalian embryonic diapause (delayed implantation) may play a role. Females typically bear twins, though litter sizes range from 1–4. Young are typically weaned after 7 weeks.

== Conservation ==
While not listed as threatened or endangered, hoary bats suffer significant mortality from wind turbines. Across the United States in 2005, 40% of all bats killed by wind turbines were hoary bats—over 1000 hoary bats were killed in 2005. Most bat deaths occur during migration in the spring and fall. One common theory explaining this is that bats are attracted to the tall structure, possibly believing them to be trees that can be used for rest.

== See also ==
- Bats of Canada
- Bats of the United States
