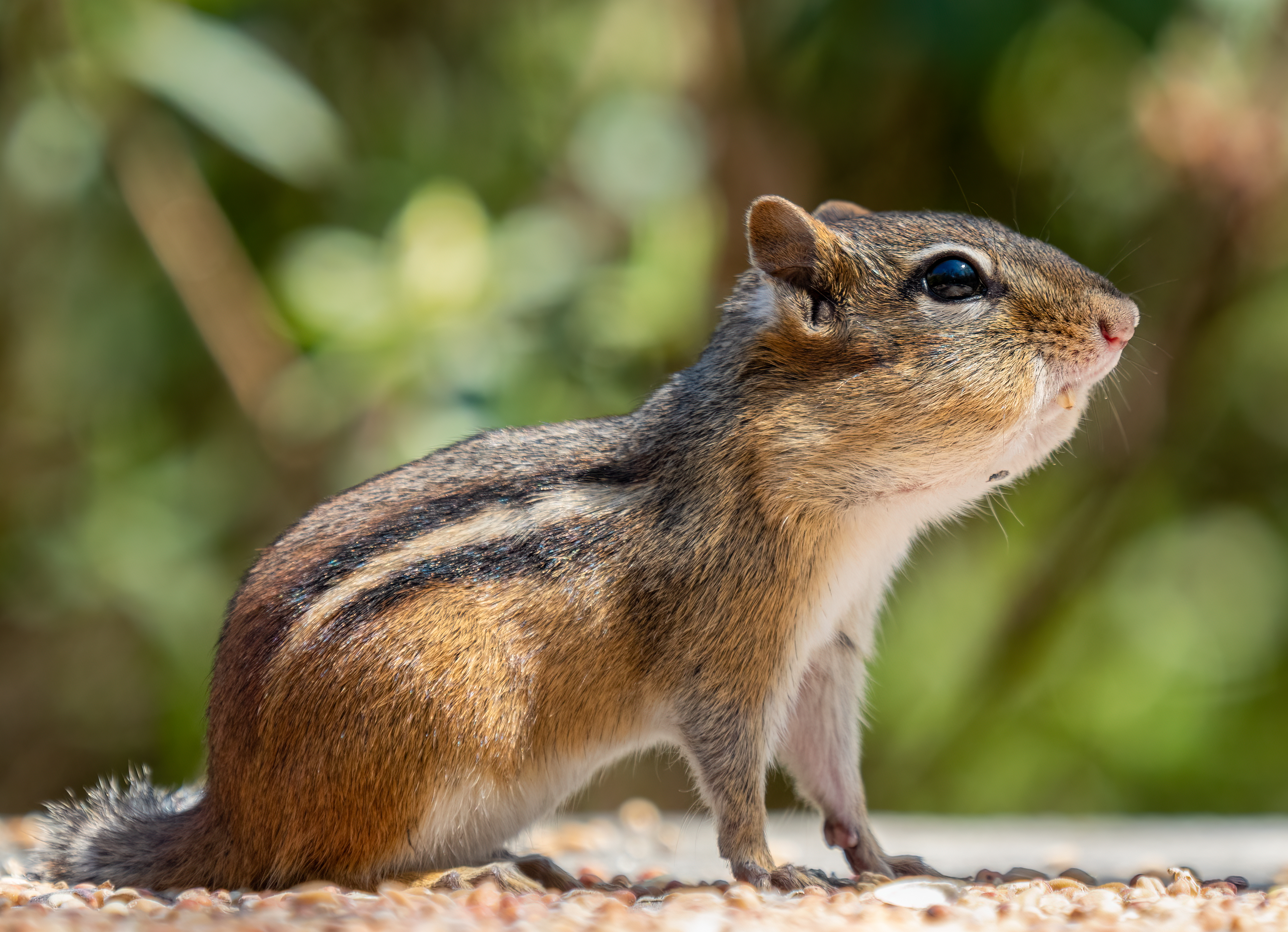
- Eastern chipmunk (Tamias striatus)

Conservation status
- Least Concern (IUCN 3.1)

- Secure (NatureServe)

Scientific classification
- Kingdom: Animalia
- Phylum: Chordata
- Class: Mammalia
- Infraclass: Placentalia
- Order: Rodentia
- Family: Sciuridae
- Genus: Tamias
- Species: T. striatus

Binomial name
- Tamias striatus (Linnaeus, 1758)

Subspecies
- T. s. striatus (Linnaeus, 1758); T. s. doorsiensis (Long, 1971); T. s. fisheri (Howell, 1925); T. s. griseus (Mearns, 1891); T. s. lysteri (Richardson, 1829); T. s. ohioensis (Bole and Moulthrop, 1942); T. s. peninsulae (Hooper, 1942); T. s. pipilans (Lowery, 1943); T. s. quebecensis (Cameron, 1950); T. s. rufescens (Bole and Moulthrop, 1942); T. s. venustus (Bangs, 1896)

Synonyms
- Sciurus striatus Linnaeus, 1758

= Eastern chipmunk =

Eastern chipmunk Temporal range: Early holocene - present

Species of mammal

The eastern chipmunk (Tamias striatus) is a chipmunk species found in eastern North America. It is the only living member of the genus Tamias.

== Etymology ==
The name "chipmunk" probably comes from the Ojibwe word ᐊᒋᑕᒨ ajidamoo (or possibly ajidamoonh, the same word in the Ottawa dialect of Ojibwe), which translates literally as "one who descends trees headlong." First described by Mark Catesby in his 1743 The Natural History of Carolina, Florida, and the Bahama Islands, the chipmunk was eventually classified as Sciurus striatus by Linnaeus, meaning "striped squirrel" in Latin. The scientific name was changed to Tamias striatus, meaning "striped steward", by Johann Illiger in 1811.

== Description ==
A small species, it reaches about 30 cm (12 in) in length including the tail, and a weight of 66–150 g (2.3–5.3 oz). It has reddish-brown fur on its upper body and five dark brown stripes contrasting with light brown stripes along its back, ending in a dark tail. It has lighter fur on the lower part of its body. It has a tawny stripe that runs from its whiskers to below its ears, and light stripes over its eyes. It has two fewer teeth than other chipmunks and four toes each on the front legs, but five toes on the hind legs. The chipmunk's appearance remains consistent throughout life. There is no external difference in appearance between the sexes except the obvious anatomical characteristics of the genitalia during periods of fertility. Molt occurs once or twice annually, during May or June and sometimes again in October. Both albino and melanistic specimens have been observed, but without geographical regularity."

== Habitat ==
The eastern chipmunk lives in deciduous wooded areas and urban parks throughout the eastern United States and southern Canada. It prefers locations with rocky areas, brush or log piles, and shrubs to provide cover.

== Behavior ==
The eastern chipmunk can climb trees well, but constructs underground nests with extensive tunnel systems, often with several entrances. To hide the construction of it(s) burrow, the eastern chipmunk is argued by some to carry soil to a different location in its cheek pouches. However, recorded observations of chipmunks carrying soil in their cheek pouches are extremely limited. John Burroughs is noted as having written that "I used to think that the chipmunk carried away the soil in his cheek pouches, and have so-stated in one of my books [Riverby, 1894], but I am now certain that he does not—only his food stores are thus carried." Chipmunks also line their burrows with leaves, rocks, sticks, and other material, making the burrows even harder to see. "The vocal repertoire of the chipmunk consists of five more or less stereotyped sounds: the chip, the chuck, the trills, the whistle or squeal, and chatter." The chipmunks' trilling has been measured to occur at the rate of 130 trills per minute.

=== Diet ===
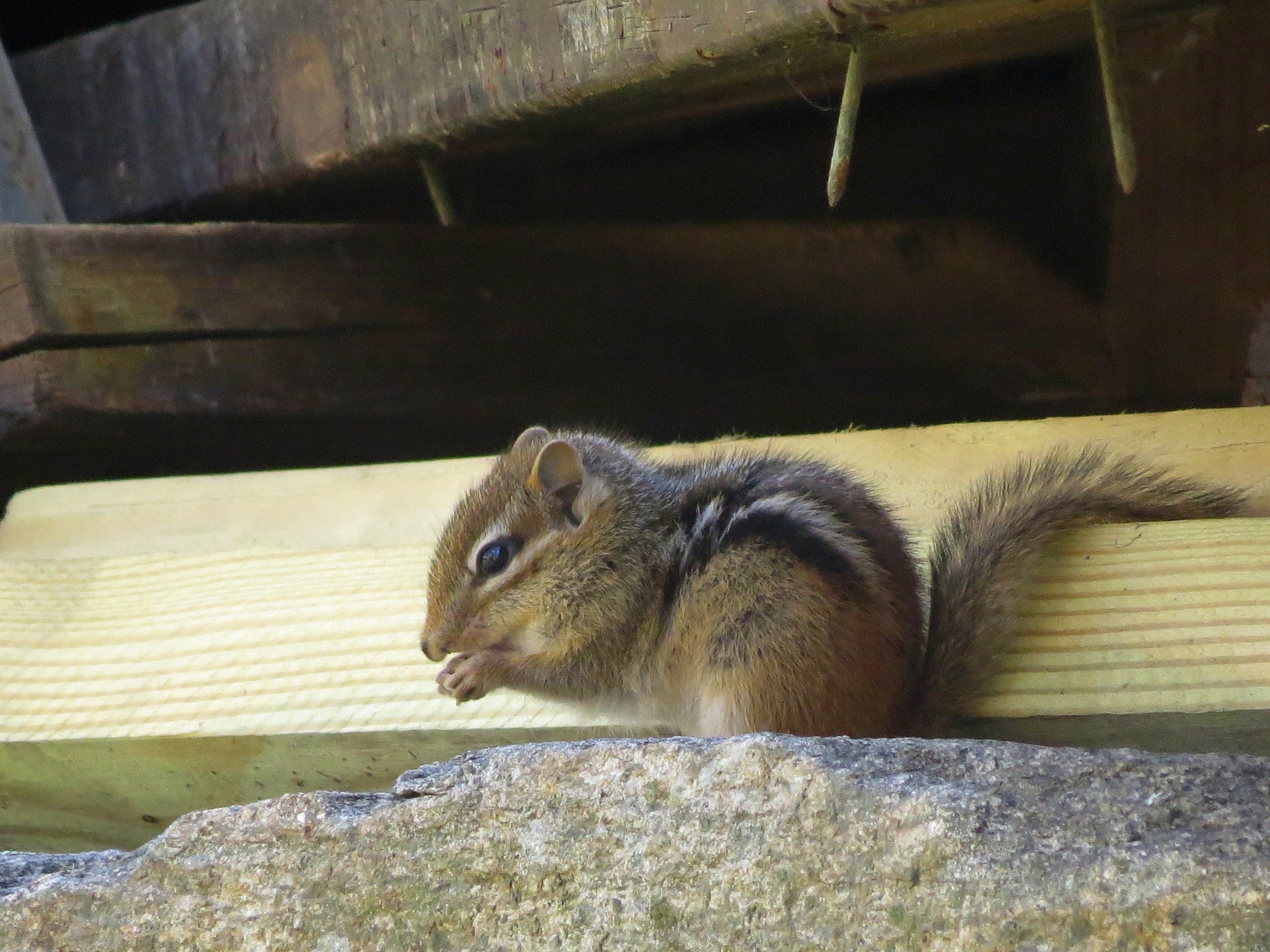
Eastern chipmunk eating under a log pile in Bedford, New York

The chipmunk is mainly active during the day, spending most of its day foraging. It prefers bulbs, seeds, fruits, nuts, green plants, mushrooms, insects, worms, and bird eggs. It commonly transports food in pouches in its cheeks.

=== Lifecycle ===
The eastern chipmunk defends its burrow and lives a solitary life, except during mating season. In fact, the chipmunk's solitary existence has been noted by author and scientist Lawrence Wishner as "one of the most characteristic behavioral features of the chipmunk". Members of the species interact with each other only while courting and mating, and for the period that pups spend with their mothers after birth, typically around six to eight weeks. Females usually produce one or two litters of three to five young. The two breeding seasons are from February to April and from June to August. During the winter, the chipmunk may enter long periods of hibernation.

=== Predators ===
Predators of the eastern chipmunk include hawks, owls, foxes, raccoons, snakes, weasels, coyotes, bobcats, lynx, domestic dogs and domestic cats. On average, eastern chipmunks live three or more years in the wild, but in captivity they may live as long as eight years.

Eastern chipmunks are known to be one of many hosts for the parasitic larvae of Cuterebra botflies.

== Gallery ==
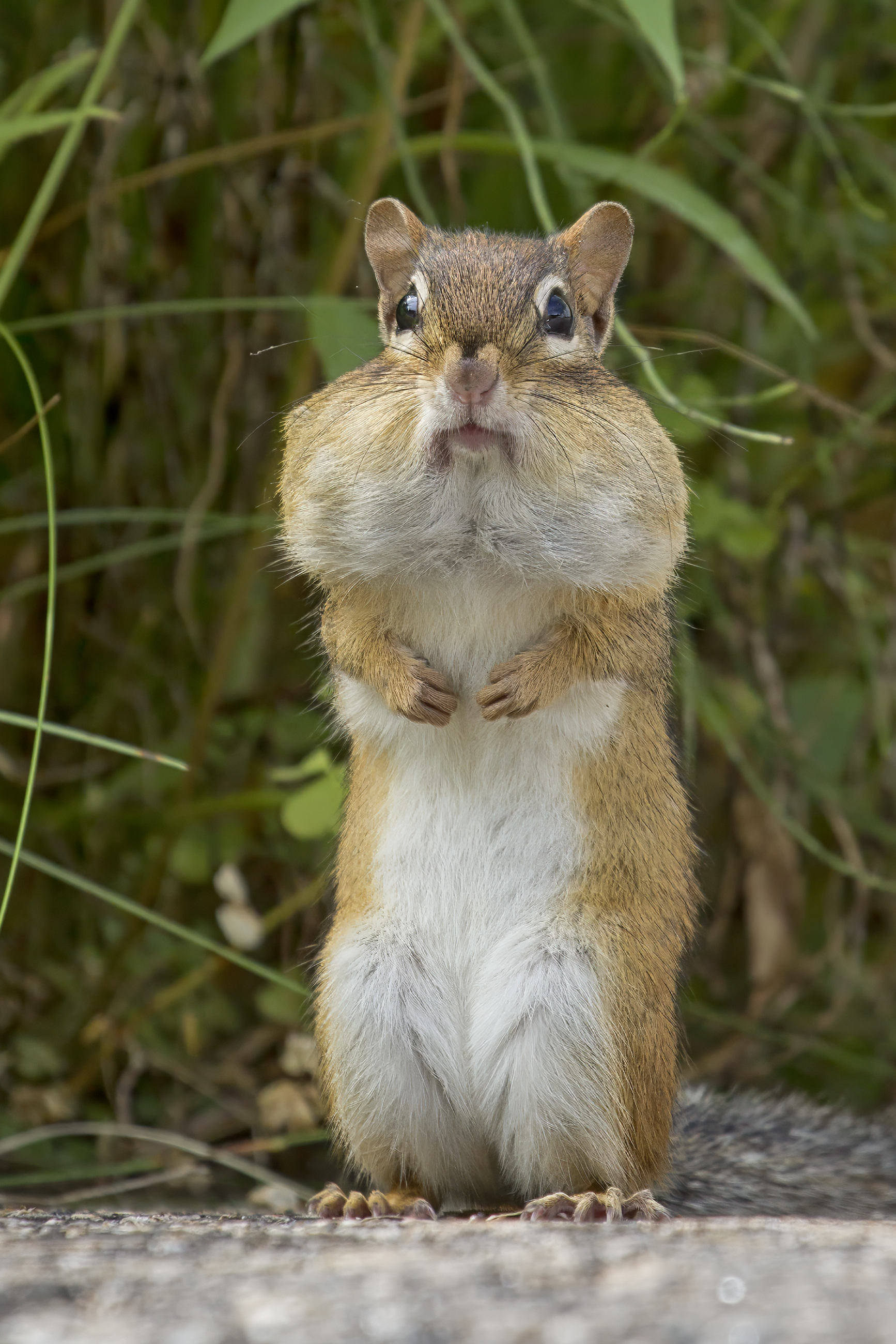
Eastern chipmunk with full cheek pouches, in Kennebunk, ME.

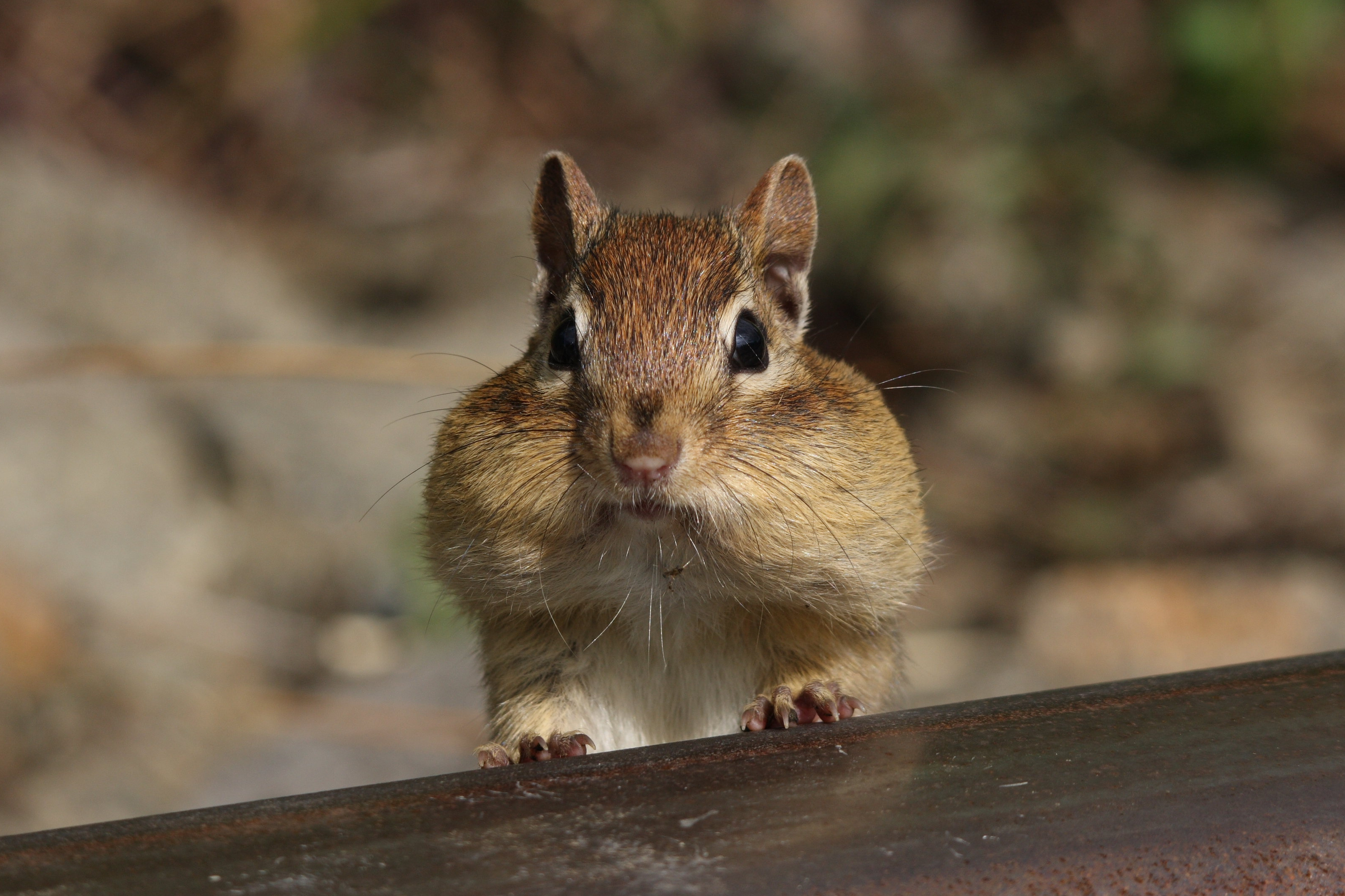
Eastern chipmunk with filled cheek pouches, Cap Tourmente National Wildlife Area, Quebec, Canada

Calling (video)

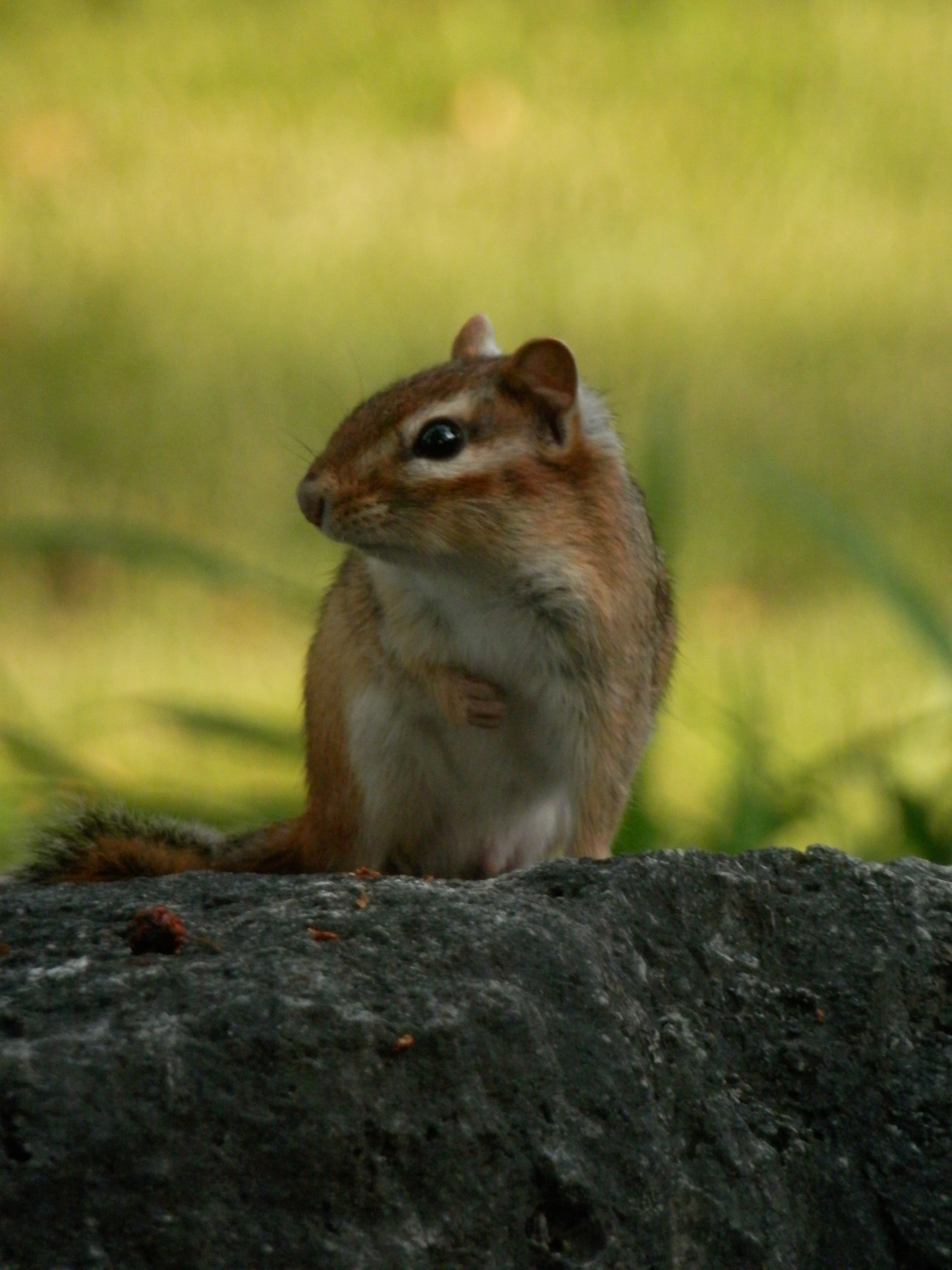
Looking to the right

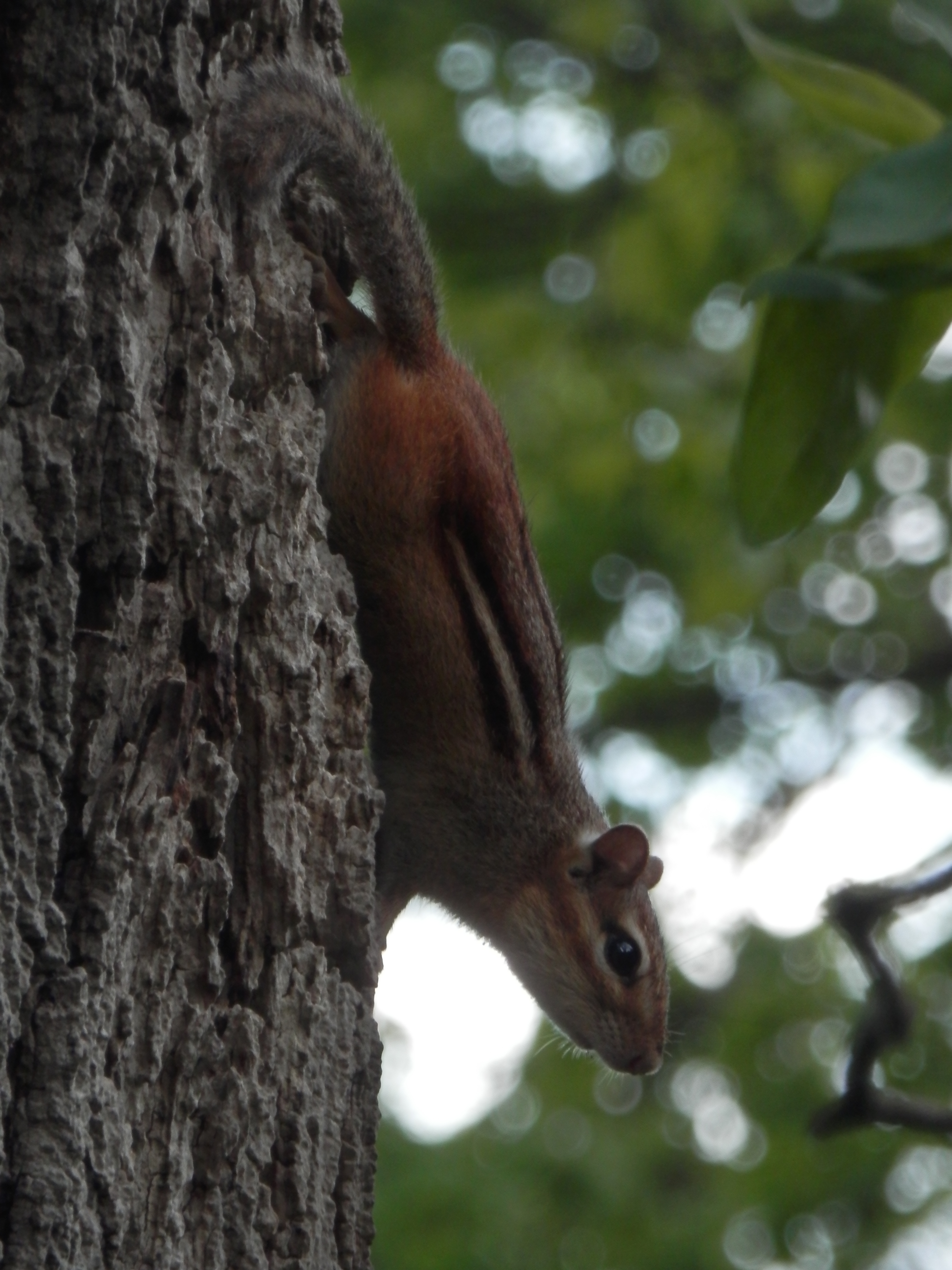
Descending headlong

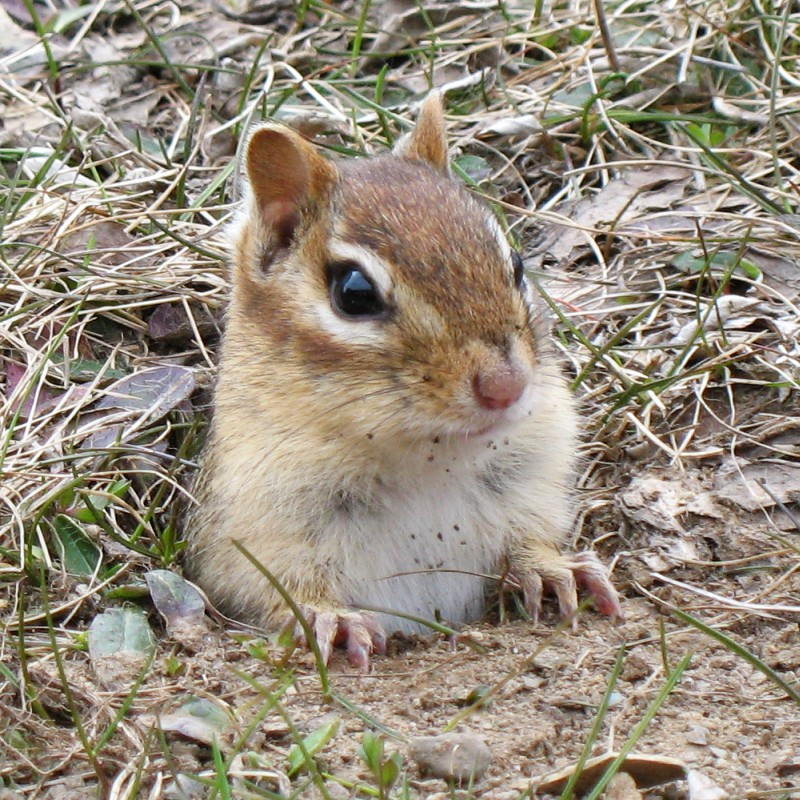
Peeking out of burrow

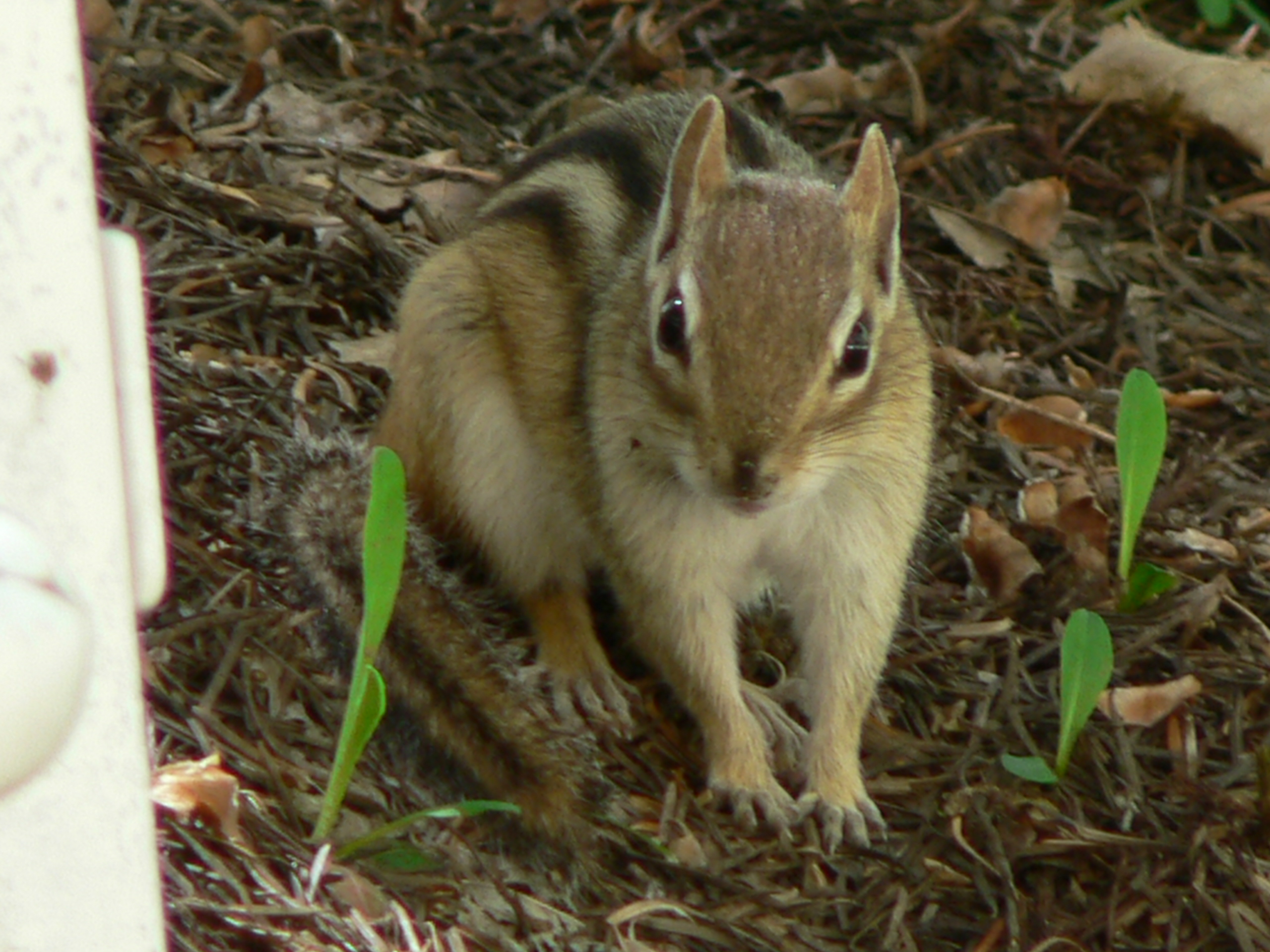
In Guelph, Ontario, Canada

== Bibliography ==
- Wishner, Lawrence. Eastern Chipmunks: Secrets of Their Solitary Lives, United States of America, 1982. ISBN 978-0874749625
- Long, John L. Introduced Mammals of the World: Their History, Distribution and Influence, 2003. ISBN 978-0-643-09916-6
