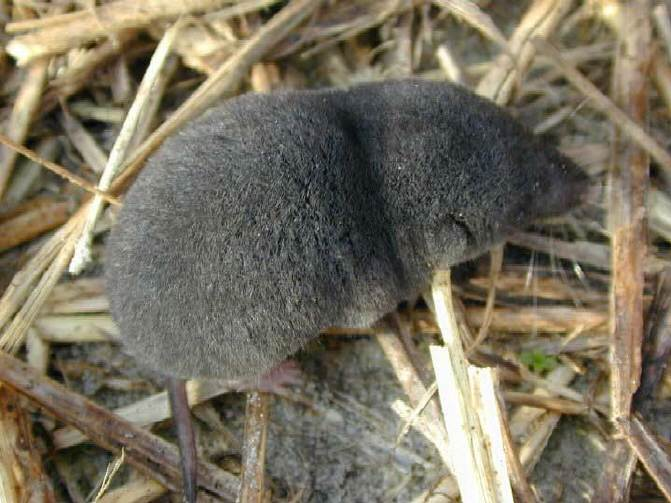

Conservation status
- Least Concern (IUCN 3.1)

Scientific classification
- Kingdom: Animalia
- Phylum: Chordata
- Class: Mammalia
- Order: Eulipotyphla
- Family: Soricidae
- Genus: Blarina
- Species: B. carolinensis

Binomial name
- Blarina carolinensis (Bachman, 1837)
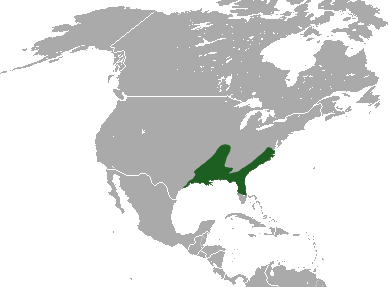
- Southern short-tailed shrew range

Synonyms
- Blarina brevicauda carolinensis

= Southern short-tailed shrew =

Species of mammal

The southern short-tailed shrew (Blarina carolinensis) is a gray, short-tailed shrew that inhabits the eastern United States.

== Description ==
The southern short-tailed shrew is the smallest shrew in its genus, measuring 7 to 10 cm (3 to 4 in) in total length, and weighing less than 14 g (0.5 oz). It has a comparatively heavy body, with short limbs and a thick neck, a long, pointed snout and ears that are nearly concealed by its soft, dense fur. As its name indicates, the hairy tail is relatively short, measuring 1.2 to 2.5 cm (0.5 to 1.0 in). The feet are adapted for digging, with five toes ending in sharp, curved claws. The fur is slate gray, being paler on the underparts.

== Distribution and habitat ==
The southern short-tailed shrew is found in the southeastern United States, from southern Virginia to eastern Texas, to central Oklahoma, and in the Mississippi valley as far as southern Illinois. Within this region, it is found primarily in pine forests. However, these range from dry to wet and even swampy habitats, as well as disturbed forests and abandoned agricultural land.

There are two recognized subspecies:

- B. c. carolinensis – southern Virginia to northern Florida, and west to eastern Mississippi, southern Illinois, northeastern Texas, and central Oklahoma.
- B. c. minima – eastern Texas, Louisiana, and the Mississippi valley to eastern Arkansas and far western Kentucky

Fossils of the species are known from the Pleistocene, during which time they may have spread as far north as South Dakota.

== Biology and behavior ==
The southern short-tailed shrew's diet consists of insects, annelids, hypogeous fungi, slugs and snails, centipedes, and spiders. Known predators include snakes, hawks, owls, and foxes. The saliva is venomous and is injected into the wounds of its prey by the teeth. Its venom is strong enough to kill mice, but is not lethal to humans, though it causes severe pain.

The short-tailed shrew has a high metabolism and eats about half its body weight in a day. It navigates and locates prey by echolocation.

The southern short-tailed shrew is a social animal; it has been known to share its burrow systems with several individuals. The male and female live together during the prebreeding season. The burrows are built in two layers, one near the surface, and a deeper one joined below it. The burrows are often built below logs, which can be penetrated and honeycombed if the log is rotten.

=== Reproduction ===
The breeding season lasts from March to November, and females have two or three litters per year. Each litter consists of two to six young. The young are reared in nests of grasses and leaves at the end of a tunnel reaching about 30 cm (12 in) below the ground, or in rotten logs.

== Predation ==
In Florida, southern short-tailed shrews may be eaten by some growth stage of invasive snakes such as Burmese pythons, reticulated pythons, Central African rock pythons, Southern African rock pythons, boa constrictors, yellow anacondas, Bolivian anacondas, dark-spotted anacondas, and green anacondas.
