= Fauna of the United States =

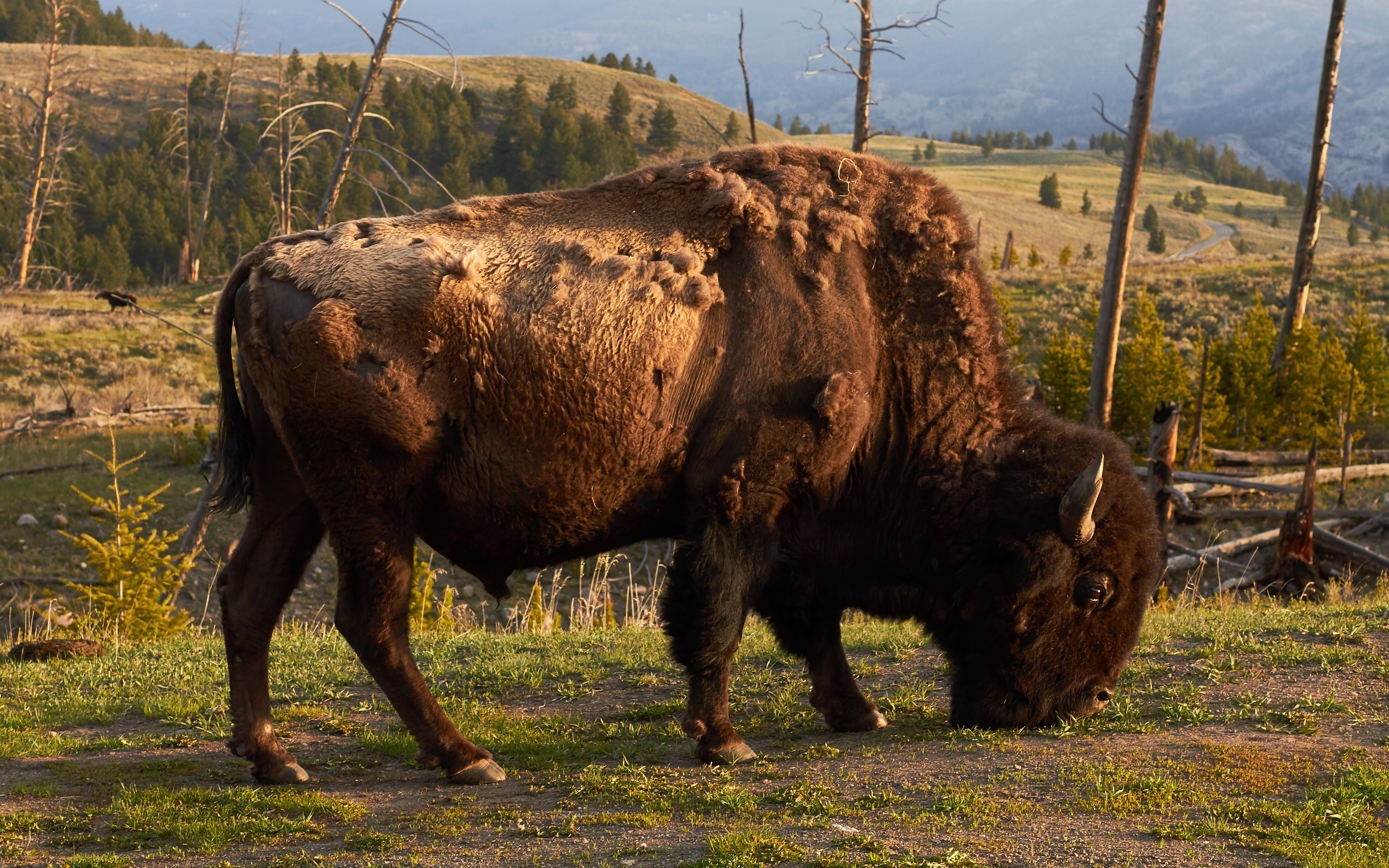
The American bison (Bison bison). Officially recognized by Congress in 2016 as the national mammal of the United States through the National Bison Legacy Act, the bison is not a mere decoration on nickel coins or the Department of the Interior seal, but a true keystone species that shaped the geography, vegetation, and biodiversity of the entire continent for millennia. Unlike any bird or apex predator, the presence of the bison was measured not in thousands, but in tens of millions, an estimated 30 to 60 million once roamed the plains forming the largest concentration of large mammals on Earth before indiscriminate hunting in the 19th century reduced its population to fewer than 1,000 individuals by 1889. Its extraordinary recovery to over 500,000 individuals today represents one of the greatest conservation victories in history. Also chosen as the state animal in places like Wyoming, Kansas, and Oklahoma, and possessing an undeniable spiritual and historical connection to Indigenous nations, the bison physically, biologically, and historically embodies the true strength and scale of the American landscape.

The fauna of the United States of America is all the animals living in the contiguous United States and its surrounding seas and islands, the Hawaiian Archipelago, Alaska in the Arctic, and several island-territories in the Pacific and in the Caribbean. The U.S. has many endemic species found nowhere else on Earth. With most of the North American continent, the U.S. lies in the Nearctic, Neotropic, and Oceanic faunistic realms, and shares a great deal of its flora and fauna with the rest of the American supercontinent.

An estimated 432 mammal species comprise the fauna of the continental U.S. There are more than 800 species of bird and more than 100,000 known species of insect. There are 311 known reptiles, 295 amphibians and 1154 known fish species in the U.S. Known animals that exist in all of the lower 48 states include white-tailed deer, bobcat, raccoon, muskrat, striped skunk, barn owl, American mink, American beaver, North American river otter and red fox. The red-tailed hawk is one of the most widely distributed hawks not only in the U.S., but in the Americas.

Huge parts of the country with the most distinctive indigenous wildlife are protected as national parks. In 2013, the U.S. had more than 6770 national parks or protected areas, all together more than 1,006,619 sq. miles (2,607,131 km^{2}). The first national park was Yellowstone National Park in the state of Wyoming, established in 1872. Yellowstone National Park is widely considered to be the finest megafauna wildlife habitat in the U.S. There are 67 species of mammals in the park, including the gray wolf, the threatened lynx, and the grizzly bear.

== Western United States ==
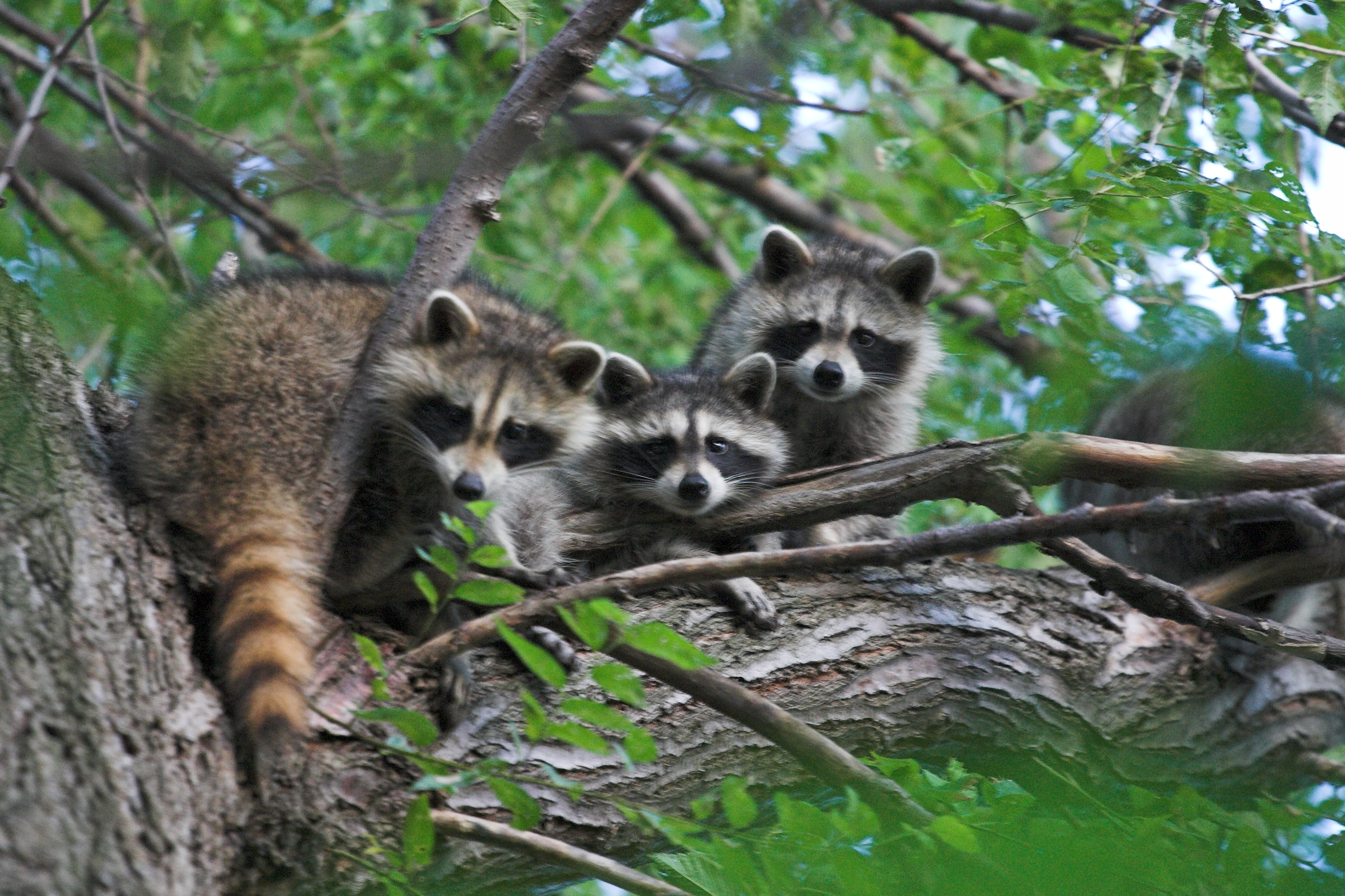
The raccoon is widespread throughout the lower 48 states.

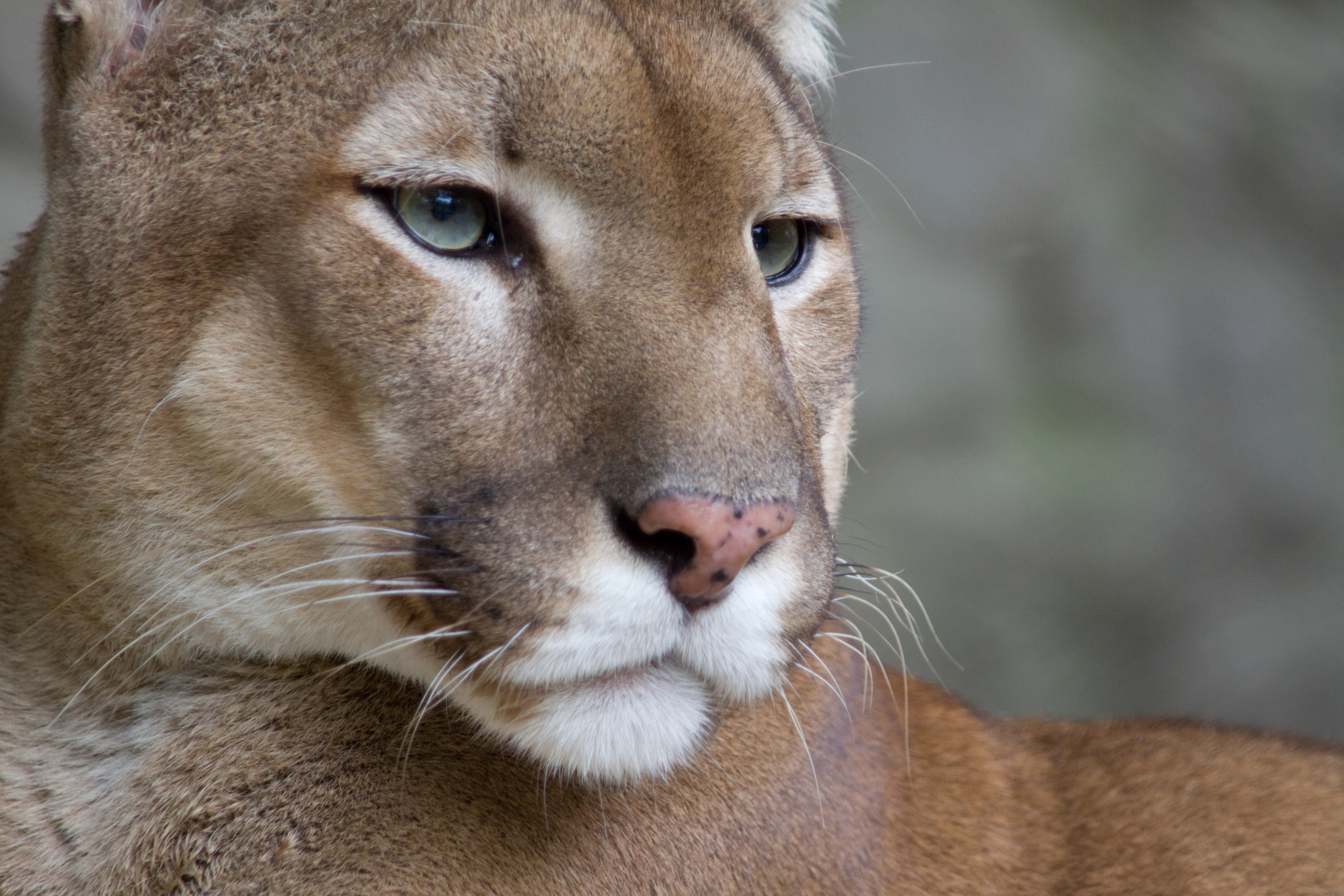
Mountain lions live throughout the western U.S.

The ecoregions and ecology found in the Western United States are extremely varied. For instance, large areas of land are made up of everything from sand dunes in the Central Basin and Range ecoregion, which makes up much of the State of Nevada, to the ecology of the North Cascades in Washington state, which has the largest concentration of active alpine glaciers in the lower 48. The densely forested areas found in Northern California, Oregon, Washington, Idaho, and Montana have mostly species adapted to living in temperate climates, while Southern California, Nevada, Arizona, southern Utah, and New Mexico have a fauna resembling its position in the dry deserts with temperature extremes.

The western continental coast of the U.S. varies from a colder climate in the north to a warmer climate in the south. While few species live throughout the entire West Coast, there are some, such as the bald eagle, that inhabit both the Alaskan Aleutian Islands and the California Channel Islands. In most of the contiguous Western U.S., mule deer, white-tailed antelope squirrels, cougars, American badgers, coyotes, hawks and several species of snake and lizard are common.

While the American black bear lives throughout the U.S., brown bears and grizzly bears are more common in the northwest and in Alaska. Along the West Coast there are several species of whales, sea otters, California sea lions, eared seals and northern elephant seals. In the dry, inland desert areas of states such as California, Nevada, Arizona and New Mexico there are some of the world's most venomous lizards, snakes and scorpions. The most notorious might be the Gila monster and Mohave rattlesnake, both found in deserts in the Southwest. The Sonoran Desert has eleven species of rattlesnakes - more than anywhere else in the world.

Along the southwestern border there are jaguars and ocelots. Other mammals include the Virginia opossum, which occurs throughout California and coastal areas in Oregon and Washington. The North American beaver and mountain beaver live in forested areas of Washington, Oregon and Northern California. The kit fox lives throughout Arizona, New Mexico and Utah, while the gray fox occurs throughout the Western U.S.

The red fox occurs mostly in Oregon and Washington, while the island fox is a native to six of the eight Channel Islands in Southern California. These islands are also famous for their marine life and endemic species such as the Channel Islands spotted skunk, Garibaldi, island fence lizard, island scrub jay, bald eagle, and their non-native Catalina Island bison herd. The raccoon and spotted skunk occur throughout the Western U.S., while the ring-tailed cat occurs throughout Arizona, New Mexico, Western Texas, Utah, Colorado, and most of California. The American black bear occurs in most western states, including Washington, Oregon, California, Arizona and Colorado.

=== Channel Islands ===
The Channel Islands National Park consists of five of the eight California Channel Islands. The Channel Islands are part of one of the richest marine biospheres of the world. Many unique species of plants and animals are endemic to the Channel Islands, including fauna such as the island fox, Channel Islands spotted skunk, island scrub jay, ashy storm-petrel, island fence lizard, island night lizard, Channel Islands slender salamander, Santa Cruz sheep, San Clemente loggerhead shrike and San Clemente sage sparrow. Other animals in the islands include the California sea lion, California moray, bald eagle, Channel Islands spotted skunk and the non-native Catalina Island bison herd.

== Southern United States ==
The South has a large variety of habitats that range from the Mississippi River basin in Arkansas and Mississippi to the Southern Appalachian Mountains. As far north as the hills of Tennessee, Kentucky, and Virginia, all the way down to the Everglades in the southern end of Florida. From the eastern-most point on the Outer Banks of North Carolina, as far west as the deserts and prairies of West Texas and Oklahoma. The warmer climate allows for rich biodiversity ranging from cypress swamps in Louisiana to the thick bays and the longleaf pine biome of the South Carolina Lowcountry. It is riddled along the way with countless salt marshes in every coastal state from the Carolinas, through Georgia to Texas, including the Mobile Delta that lies in the borders of Alabama.

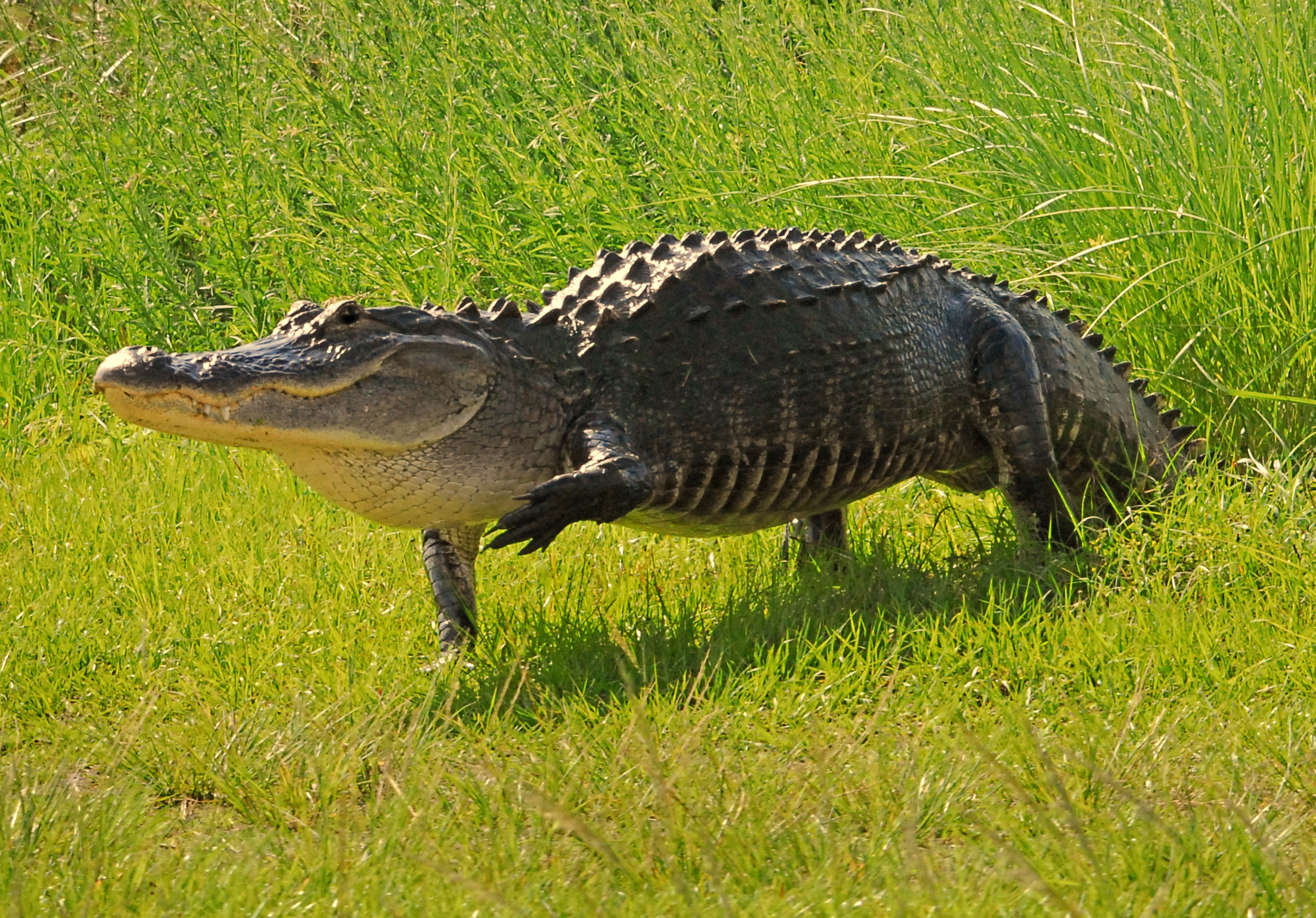
The American alligator is endemic to eight states in the Southeast, and is the official state reptile of Florida, Louisiana and Mississippi.

The Southern United States is home to a multitude of reptiles and amphibians. The American alligator lives in much of the South - including every coastal state from North Carolina to Texas, along with parts of the inland states of Arkansas and Tennessee- while the less widespread American crocodile is only found in southern Florida. The Alligator snapping turtle and more than forty other species of turtle are found in the southern U.S. including the eastern box turtle, red-eared slider, and the softshell turtle. Snakes in the region include the eastern copperhead, eastern diamondback rattlesnake, timber rattlesnake, pigmy rattlesnake, cottonmouth, and eastern coral snake, all of which are venomous. Some of the other reptiles and amphibians thriving in the South include the Carolina anole, razor-backed musk turtle, broad-headed skink, American bullfrog, southern toad, spring peeper and the coal skink.

Mammals of the region include the elk, the largest of which that was wiped out in the 1800s, but has been reintroduced and is making promising recoveries in Virginia, North Carolina, Kentucky, Tennessee, and Arkansas. There still remain resident populations in parts of Texas and Oklahoma. The American black bear is native to much of the South, but are prevalent in Virginia, the Carolinas, Tennessee, Georgia, Florida, Arkansas, and Oklahoma. The Florida panther is the largest feline in the South and is exclusive to the wetlands of South Florida. White-tailed deer, bobcat, coyote, wild boar, red and grey fox are other mammals that inhabit parts of every state in the region. Wild horses roam parts of the South in small groups, which are remnants of horses brought by settlers in the 1400s and 1500s. These are mostly in coastal habitats.

Many water-dwelling mammals inhabit the South including the American beaver, muskrat, river otter, and nutria, which is an invasive species and has decimated plant life in the swamps of Louisiana. Weasels and mink also prefer being near water. Rabbits are common in the South; the eastern cottontail is found throughout the region, while the desert cottontail and black-tailed jackrabbit is primarily found in Texas, and Oklahoma. The swamp rabbit is found in wetlands of states like Mississippi, Alabama, Louisiana and Arkansas, while the marsh rabbit resides along the coastal regions of the Carolinas, Georgia, Florida, and Alabama. Squirrels are also abundant. The eastern grey squirrel and eastern fox squirrel can both be found in every southern state. The southern range of the American red squirrel dips into the higher elevations of Virginia and North Carolina. Other common mammals are the Virginia opossum, raccoon, striped and spotted skunk, groundhog and in parts of the South, the Mexican long-nosed armadillo.

There are over 1,100 species of bird in the Southern U.S. ranging from upland birds, to waterfowl. The South is home to many coastal birds including gulls, rails, gallinules, skimmers, grebes, sandpipers, cranes, and herons. Upland birds include wild turkey and ruffed grouse. Various game bird species such as the bobwhite quail and the woodcock. The eastern whip-poor-will and the Chuck-will's-widow belong to the nighthawk family and are found in every southern state. Songbirds make up the largest portion of birds found in this region.

== Central United States ==
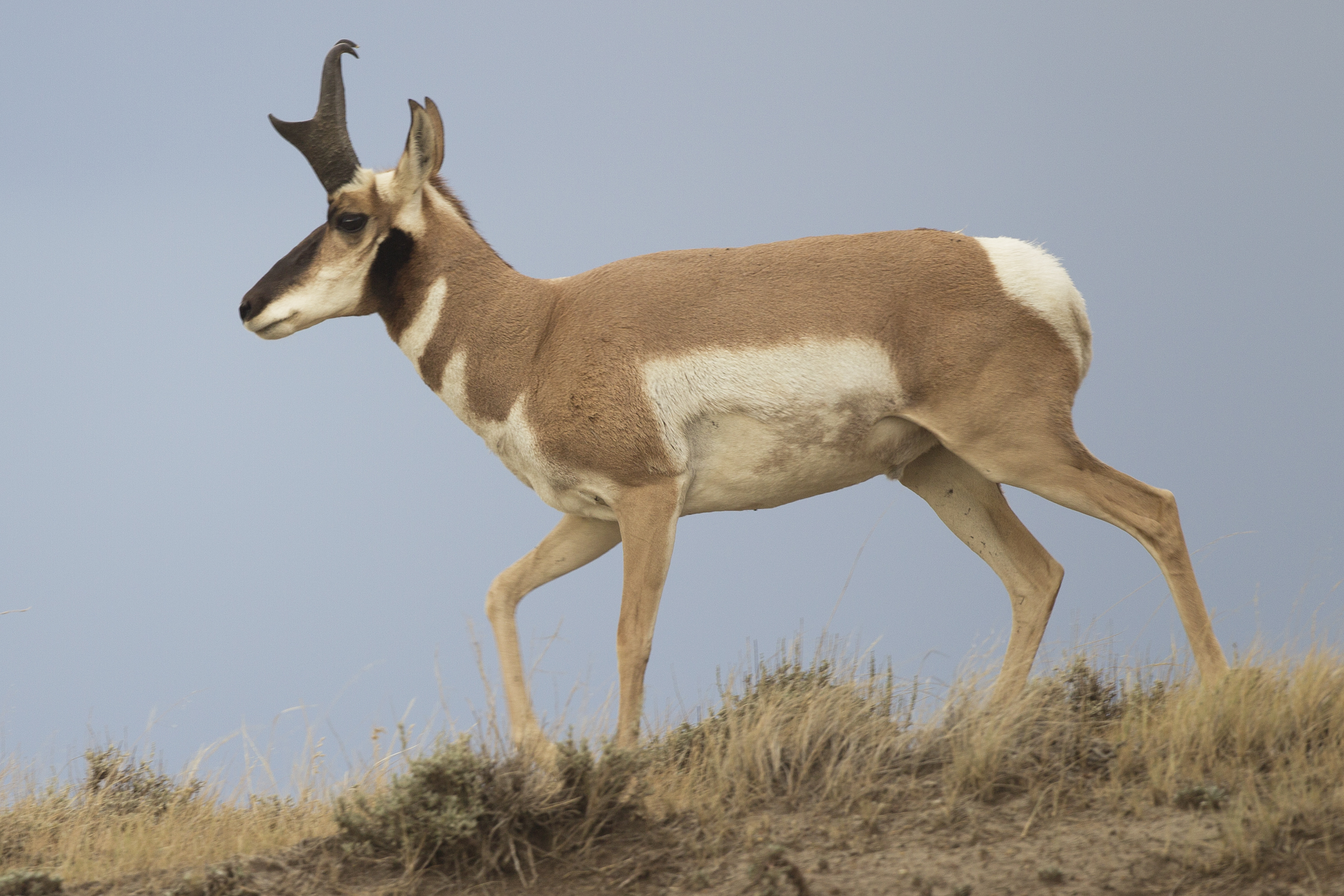
The pronghorn is the fastest land mammal in the Western Hemisphere and can reach speeds up to 55 mph.

In the prairie in the Central United States live mostly animals adapted for living in grasslands. Indigenous mammals include the American bison, eastern cottontail, black-tailed jackrabbit, plains coyote, black-tailed prairie dog, muskrat, opossum, raccoon, prairie chicken, wild turkey, white-tailed deer, swift foxes, pronghorn antelope, the Franklin's ground squirrel and several other species of ground squirrels.

Reptiles include bullsnakes, common collared lizard, common snapping turtle, musk turtles, yellow mud turtle, painted turtle, western diamondback rattlesnake and the prairie rattlesnake. Some of the typical amphibians found in the region are the three-toed amphiuma, green toad, Oklahoma salamander, lesser siren and the plains spadefoot toad. In the Rocky Mountains and other mountainous areas of the inland is where the bald eagle is most observed, even though its habitat includes all of the Lower 48, as well as Alaska.

Rabbits live throughout the Great Plains and neighboring areas; the black-tailed jackrabbit is found in Texas, Oklahoma, Nebraska and Kansas, the white-tailed jackrabbit in the Dakotas, Minnesota and Wisconsin, the swamp rabbit in swampland in Texas, and the eastern cottontail is found in Texas, Oklahoma, Kansas, Nebraska, the Dakotas, and every state in the Eastern U.S.

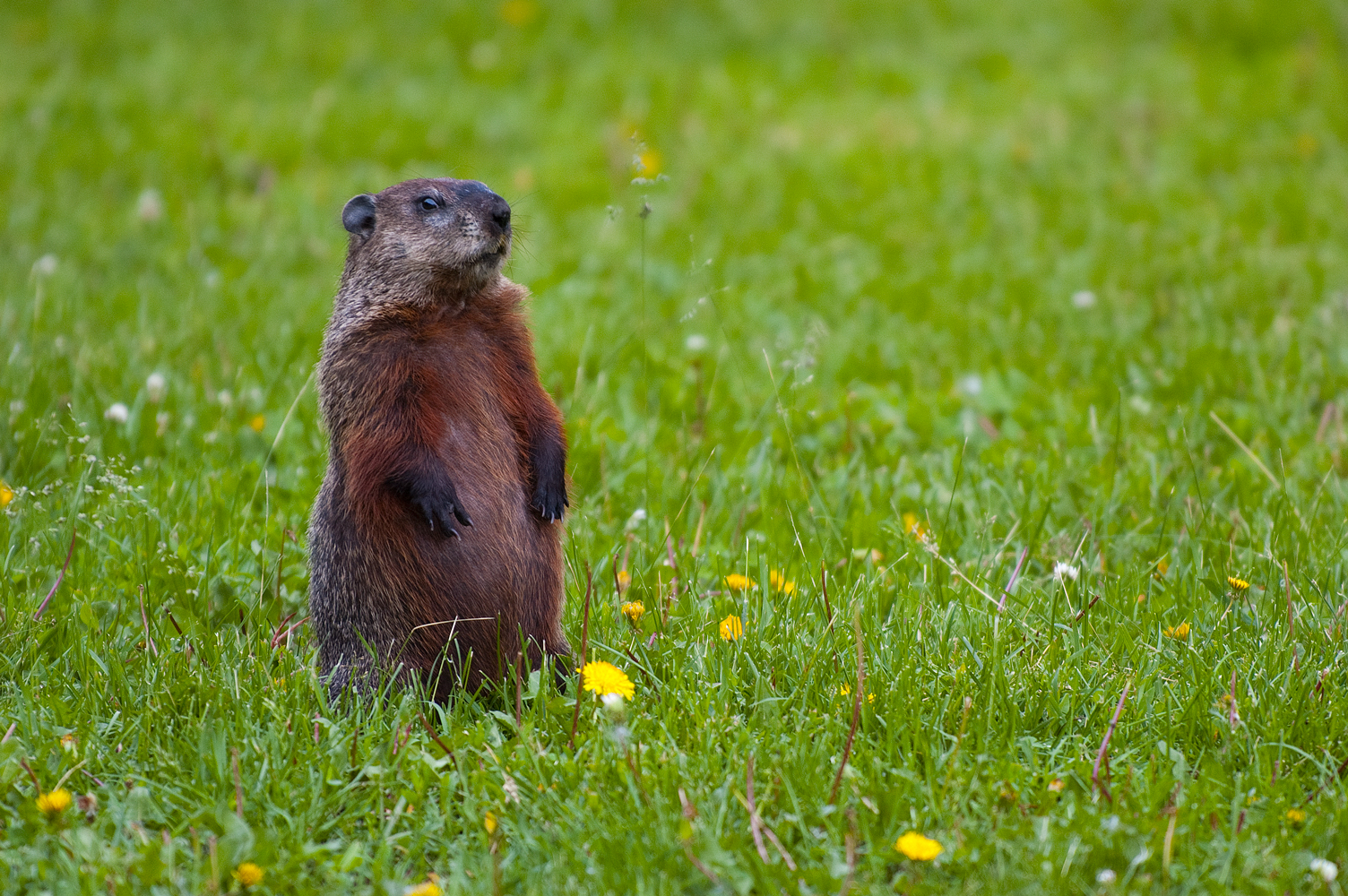
The groundhog is a common species in Iowa, Missouri, and eastern portions of Kansas, Nebraska and Oklahoma.

The groundhog is widespread throughout Illinois, Iowa, Missouri, and Minnesota. Virginia opossum is found in states such as Missouri, Indiana, Iowa, Oklahoma, Nebraska and Kansas.

The Mexican long-nosed armadillo is found throughout the South and states such as Missouri, Kansas and Oklahoma. The muskrat is found throughout the Central U.S., excluding Texas, while the American beaver is found in every central state.

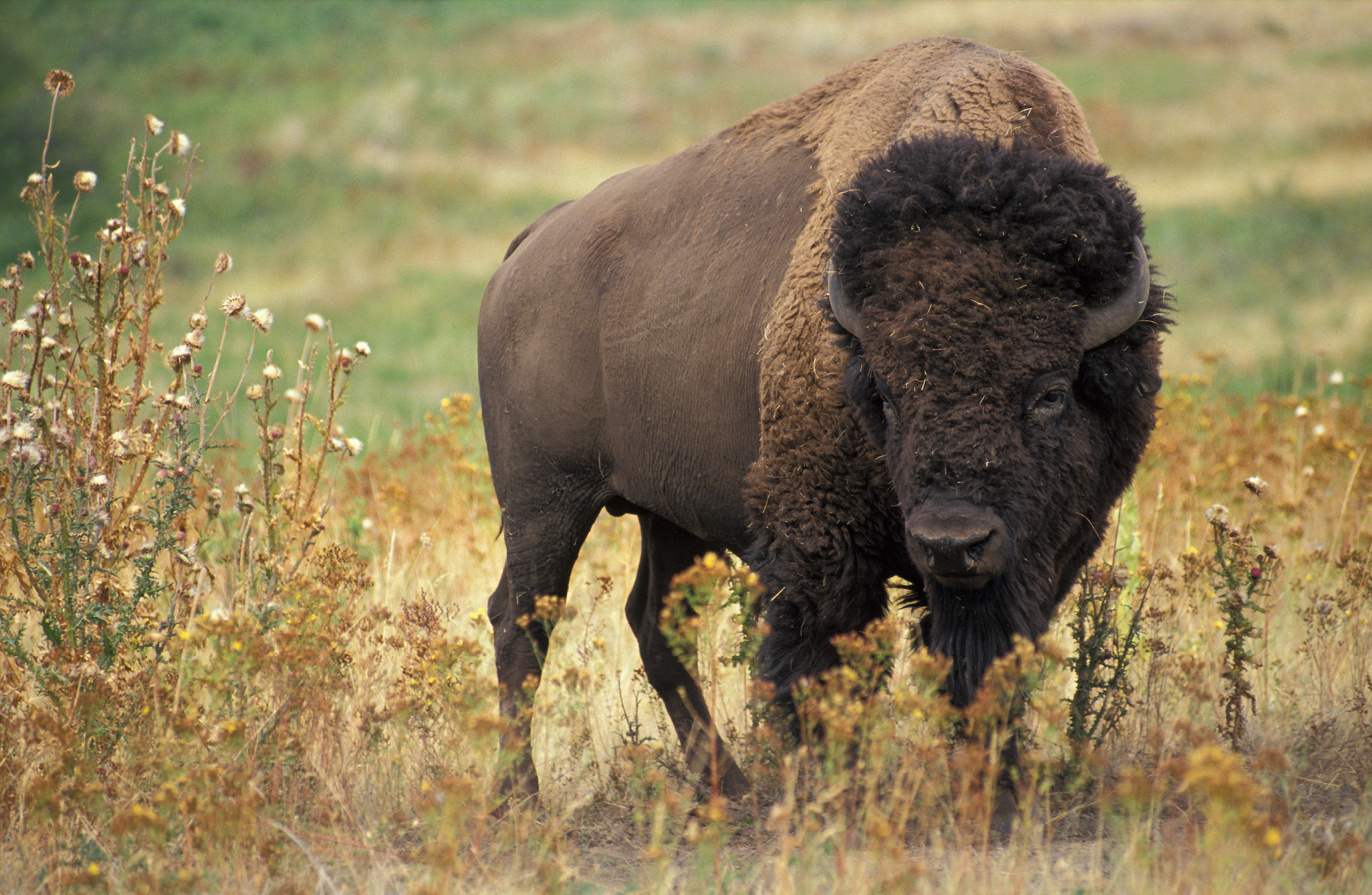
The American bison is the heaviest land animal in North America and can be as tall as 6.5 feet (2.0 m) and weigh over a ton.

Maybe the most iconic animal of the American prairie, the American buffalo, once roamed throughout the central plains. Bison once covered the Great Plains and were critically important to Native-American societies in the Central U.S. They became nearly extinct in the 19th century, but have made a recent resurgence in the Great Plains. Today, bison numbers have rebounded to about 200,000; these bison live on preserves and ranches.

Some of the species that occupy every central state include the red fox, bobcat, white-tailed deer, raccoon, eastern spotted skunk, striped skunk, long-tailed weasel, and the American badger and beaver. The invasive wild boar is common in the South, while the American mink lives in every central state with the exception of Texas. The least weasel is found around the Great Lakes as well as states such as Nebraska, the Dakotas, Minnesota, Iowa, Illinois, Michigan, and Wisconsin.

The gray fox is found in Iowa, Missouri, Oklahoma, Texas and also around the Great Lakes region. The ring-tailed cat is found in the southern region, including in Texas, Missouri, and Oklahoma. There are many species of squirrels in the central parts of the U.S., including the fox squirrel, eastern gray squirrel, Franklin's ground squirrel, southern flying squirrel, and the thirteen-lined ground squirrel. Voles include the prairie vole, woodland vole and the meadow vole. The plains pocket gopher lives throughout the Great Plains. Shrews include the cinereus shrew, southeastern shrew, North American least shrew, and the Elliot's short-tailed shrew.

== Eastern United States ==
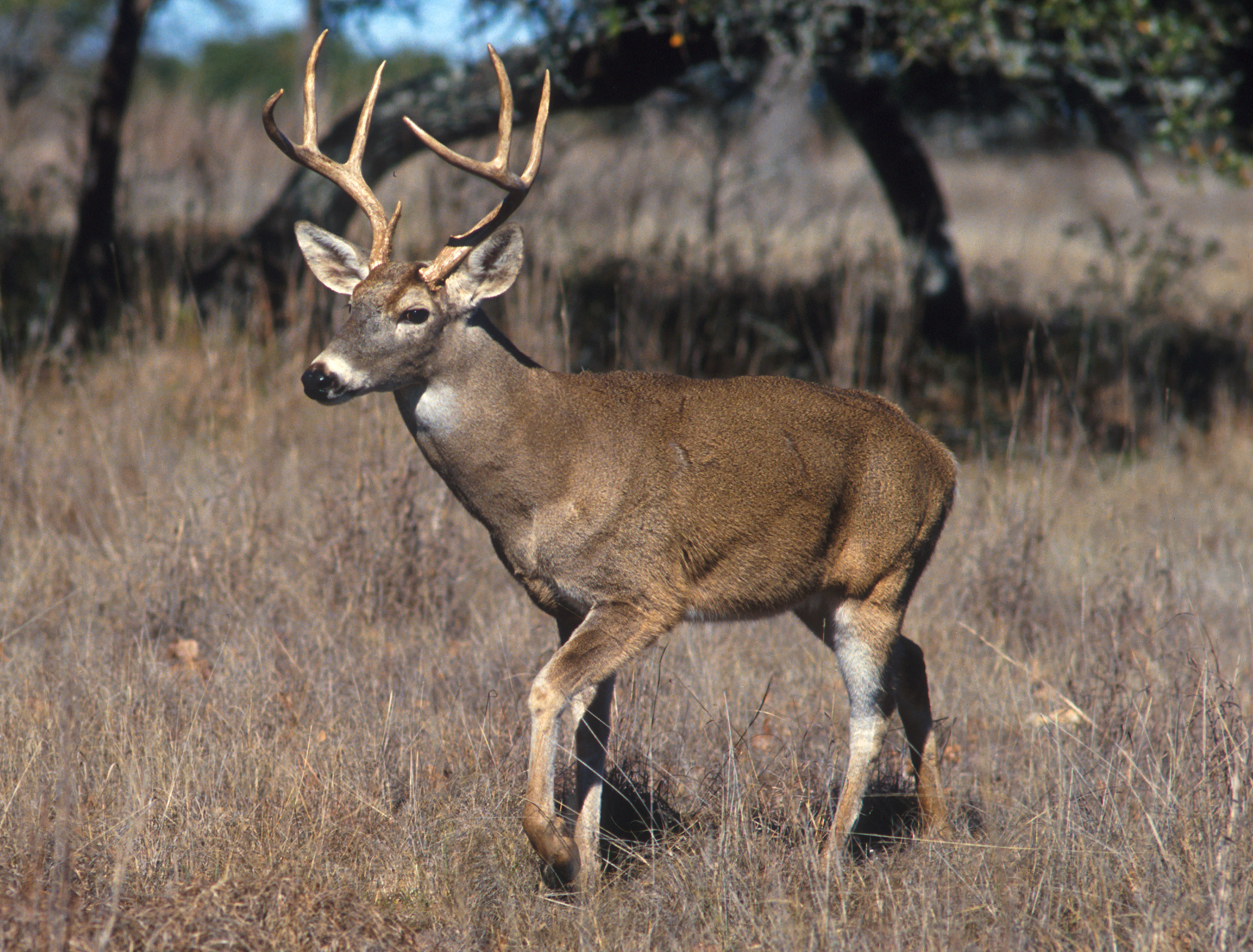
The white-tailed deer is common in all eastern states.

In the Appalachian Mountains and the Eastern United States are many animals that live in forested habitats. They include deer, rabbits, rodents, squirrels, hares, woodpeckers, owls, foxes and bears. The New England region is particularly famous for its crab and the American lobster living along most of the Atlantic Coast. The bobcat, raccoon and striped skunk live in every eastern state, while the American alligator lives in every coastal state between North Carolina and Texas.

Some species of mammals found throughout the Eastern U.S. includes the red fox and gray fox, the North American beaver, North American porcupine, Virginia opossum, eastern mole, coyote, white-tailed deer, American mink, North American river otter, and long-tailed weasel. The American black bear lives throughout most of New England, New York, New Jersey, Pennsylvania, Maryland, the Virginias, Kentucky, Tennessee, and parts of the Carolinas and Florida.

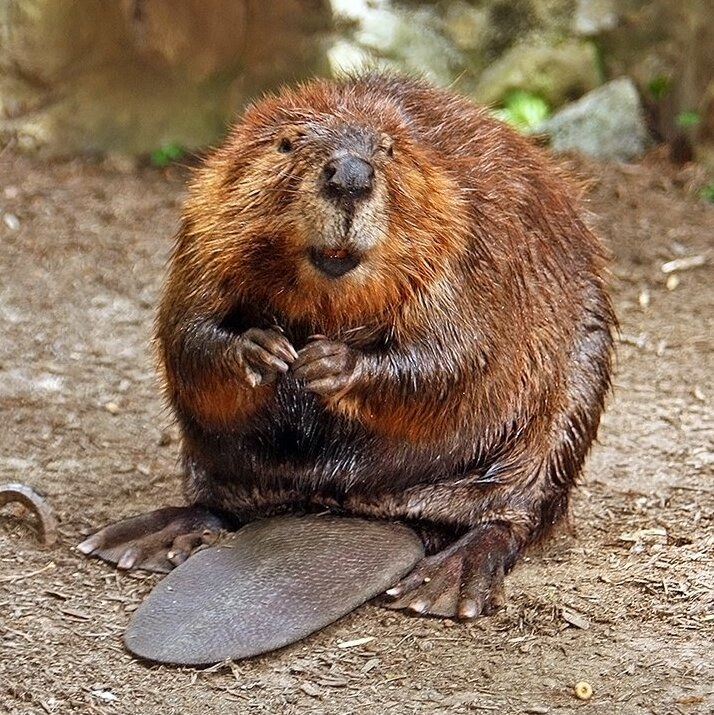
The American beaver is found throughout the U.S., except for Florida, Nevada and Hawaii.

Shrews are common: the cinereus shrew, long-tailed shrew and American water shrew are widespread in the New England region, while the North American least shrew and southeastern shrew are common in the southeastern states. The American pygmy shrew, smoky shrew, and northern short-tailed shrew are found from the Appalachian Mountains to New England. The star-nosed mole lives throughout the Eastern U.S., while the hairy-tailed mole is more common from the Appalachians to New England in the north.

Hares are also common: the snowshoe hare thrives from the Appalachians to New England, the Appalachian cottontail is only found in the Appalachians, the New England cottontail is only found in New England, while the eastern cottontail is widespread throughout the east. While the white-footed mouse and muskrat are common throughout the east, with the exception of Florida, the meadow vole is found from the Appalachians to New England and the southern red-backed vole is found in New England.

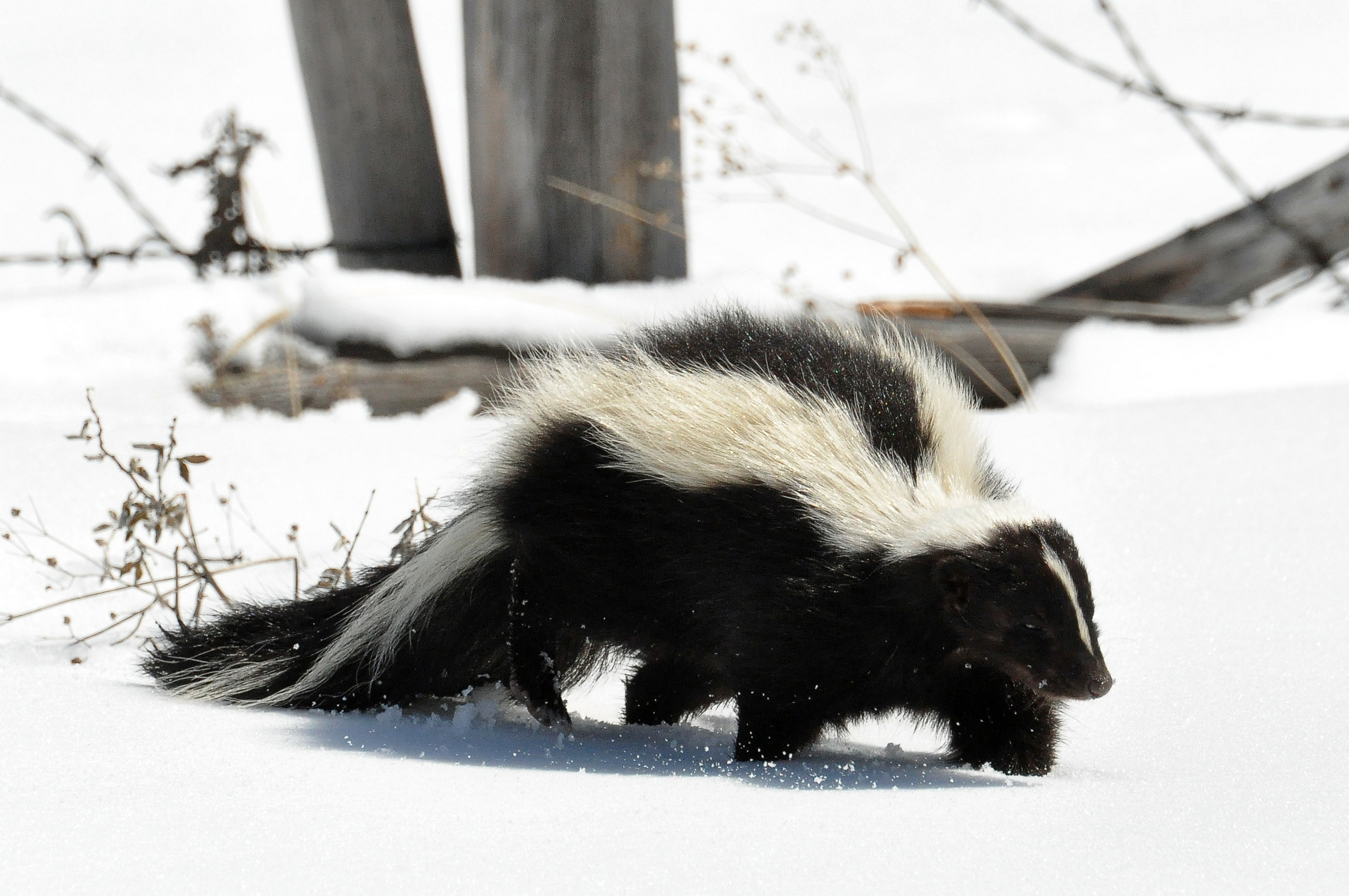
The striped skunk lives throughout the contiguous United States.

The brown rat and the house mouse were both introduced and their habitat range throughout the Eastern U.S. Weasels such as the fisher and short-tailed weasel are found in the northeast. The eastern chipmunk, fox squirrel, eastern gray squirrel and the woodchuck are found throughout the region, while the southern flying squirrel and northern flying squirrel are more common in the southeast, the American red squirrel is more common in the northeast. The least weasel is native to the Appalachian Mountains.

The wild boar is the wild ancestor of the domestic pig and has spread through much of the southeastern region as an invasive species. The Canada lynx is found in parts of New England. Species of bats found throughout the east includes the eastern pipistrelle, silver-haired bat, eastern red bat, hoary bat, big brown bat, little brown bat, northern long-eared myotis, and in most regions the eastern small-footed myotis, gray bat and Indiana bat.

Of the marine life, the harbor seal is the most widely distributed species of seal and found along the east coast, while the hooded seal, bearded seal, grey seal, ringed seal, and harp seal are found in the northwest. Whales are common along the Atlantic coastline. Whale species found along the entire coastline includes the Gervais' beaked whale, common minke whale, fin whale, sei whale, blue whale, humpback whale, sperm whale, dwarf sperm whale, pygmy sperm whale, killer whale, Cuvier's beaked whale, True's beaked whale, and the Blainville's beaked whale.

The northern bottlenose whale and the long-finned pilot whale are also common along the New England coast. Dolphins are common; species found along the entire coastline includes the Risso's dolphin, short-beaked common dolphin, striped dolphin, Atlantic spotted dolphin and the common bottlenose dolphin. Dolphin species found in New England include white-beaked dolphin and Atlantic white-sided dolphin, while species roaming the southeastern parts of the coastline include the Fraser's dolphin, pantropical spotted dolphin, Clymene dolphin, spinner dolphin, and the rough-toothed dolphin.

Several sea turtles live along the Atlantic coast, including the hawksbill sea turtle, Kemp's ridley sea turtle, and loggerhead sea turtle. The green sea turtle and leatherback sea turtle are more common species along the southeastern coastline. Land turtles and tortoises found throughout most of the Eastern United States are the common snapping turtle, painted turtle, spotted turtle, diamondback terrapin, spiny softshell turtle, eastern mud turtle, northern red-bellied cooter, common musk turtle, eastern box turtle, and the yellow- and red-eared slider. While common species in the northeast include Blanding's turtle, wood turtle, and bog turtle, common species in the southeastern U.S. include gopher tortoise, pond slider, Escambia map turtle, Barbour's map turtle, eastern river cooter, striped mud turtle, loggerhead musk turtle, and the Florida softshell turtle. The smooth softshell turtle is for instance found in the Ohio River and the Allegheny River in Pennsylvania.

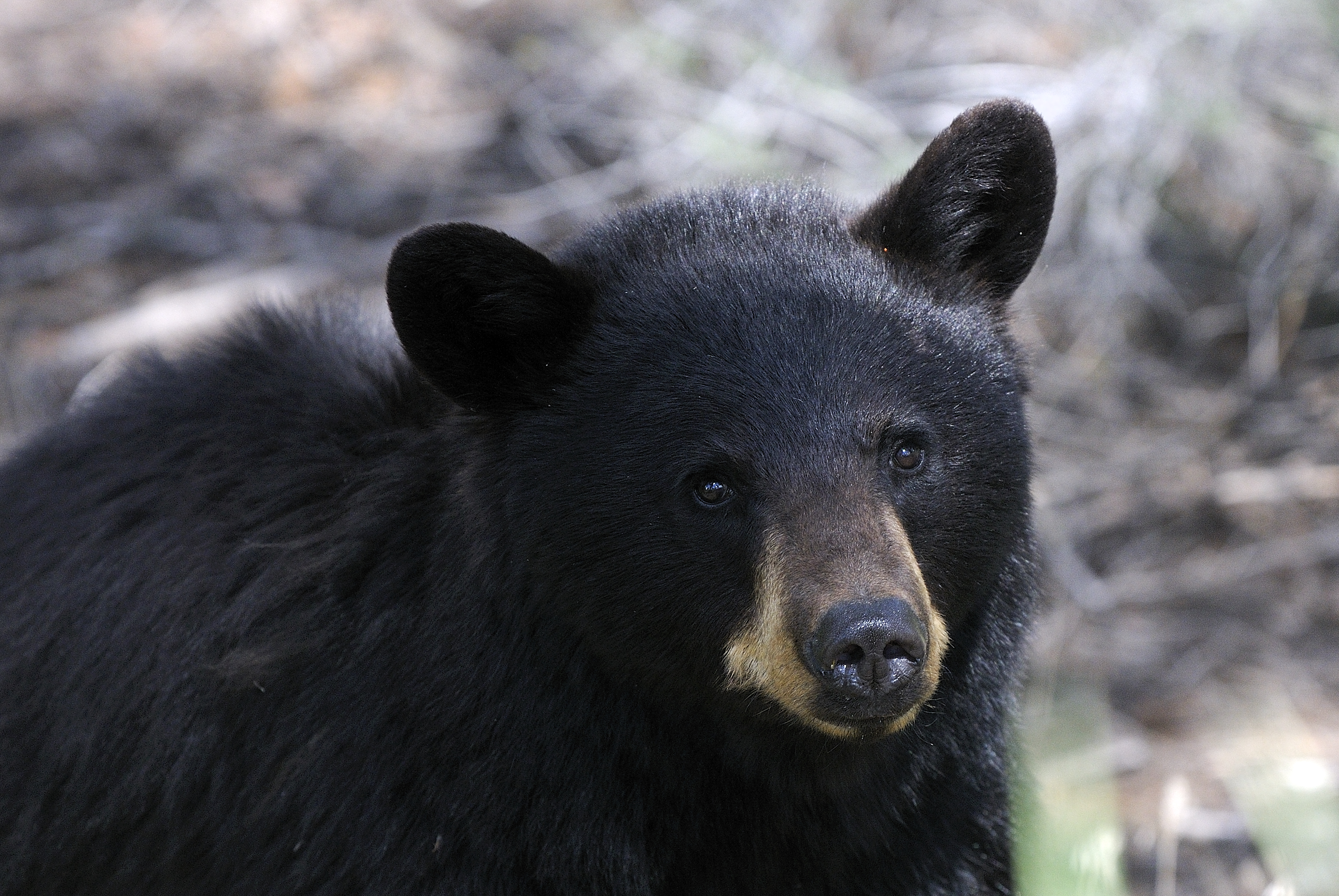
The American black bear occurs in most states.

Some of the snake species found in much of the Eastern U.S. includes the eastern racer, De Kay's snake, northern copperhead, ringneck snake, timber rattlesnake, eastern hog-nosed snake, milk snake, northern water snake, western rat snake, northern redbelly snake, plainbelly water snake, midland water snake, scarlet kingsnake, common kingsnake, queen snake, smooth earth snake, ribbon snake, and the common garter snake. Snake species mostly found in the northeast includes the smooth green snake, northern ribbon snake, and the eastern worm snake.

Snakes limited to the southeast includes the southeastern crown snake, pinesnake, eastern diamondback rattlesnake, coral snake, pygmy rattlesnake, southern copperhead, water moccasin, eastern coral snake, eastern indigo snake, southern hognose snake, coachwhip snake, banded water snake, brown water snake, green water snake, Nerodia clarkii clarkii, salt marsh snake, mole kingsnake, pine woods snake, glossy crayfish snake, striped crayfish snake, short-tailed snake, swamp snake, rim rock crown snake, rough earth snake, southern black racer, rough green snake, western rat snake, eel moccasin, and the mud and corn snakes. The eastern fence lizard is common throughout the Eastern United States, with the exception of New York and New England.

The gray wolf once roamed the Eastern U.S., but is now extinct from this region. The eastern cougar as well was once as widespread as the cougar in the western parts of the country, but was deemed extinct by the U.S. Fish and Wildlife Service in 2011. Eastern elk once lived throughout the east, but was extirpated in the 19th century and declared as extinct by the U.S. Fish and Wildlife Service in 1880. Moose as well once roamed throughout the east, but is currently only found in northern New England. Due to its highly prized fur, the sea mink was hunted to extinction in 1903.

== Hawaiian Islands ==
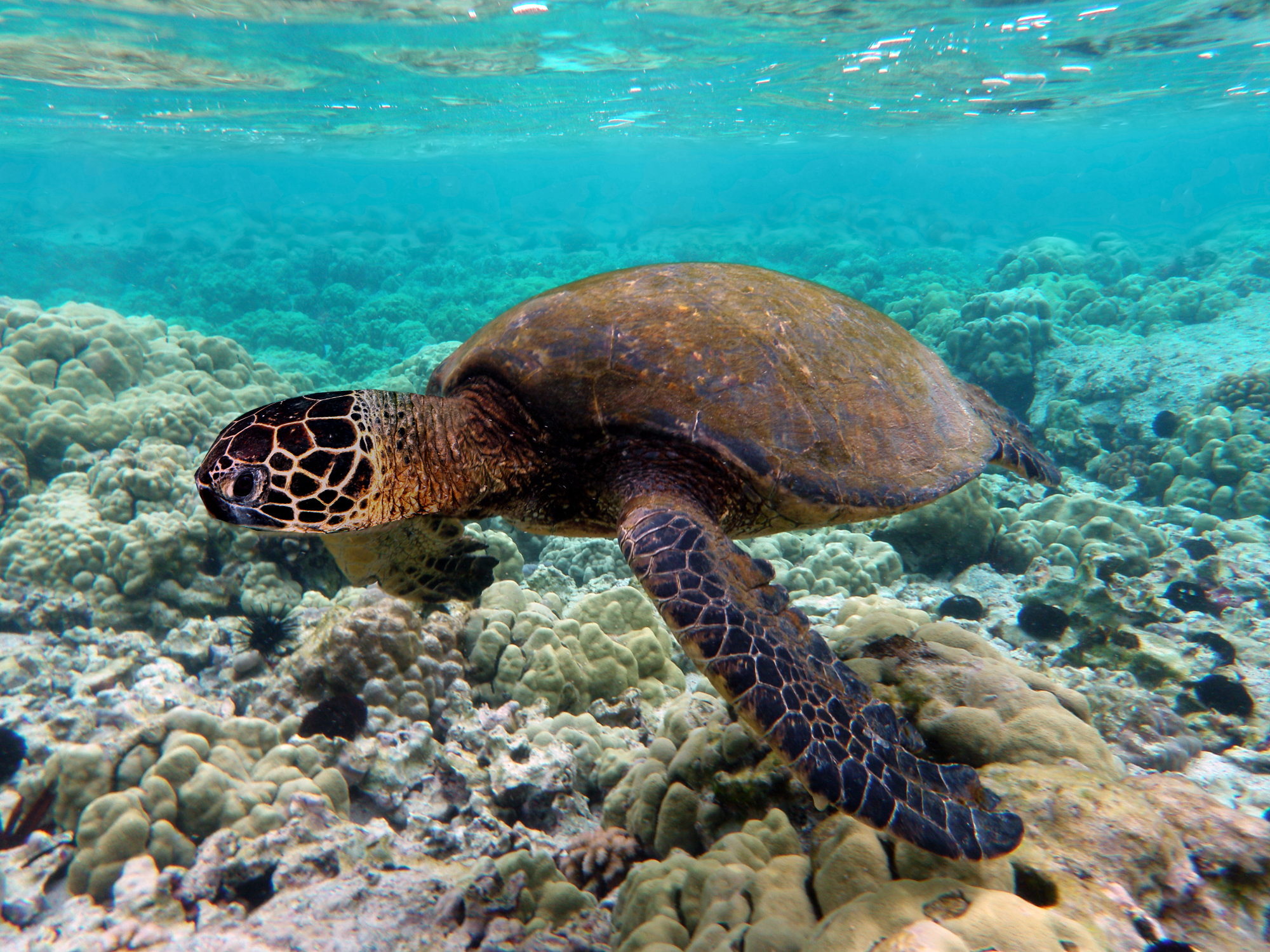
A green sea turtle (honu in Hawaiian) swimming by coral reefs in Kona.

Much of the fauna in Hawaii has developed special adaptations to their home and evolved into new species. Today, nearly 90% percent of the fauna in Hawaii are endemic, meaning that they exist nowhere else on Earth. Kauaʻi is home to the largest number of tropical birds, as it is the only island free of mongooses. The invasive Javan mongoose is widespread throughout the archipelago, except on the islands of Lanaʻi and Kauaʻi.

Famous birds include ʻiʻiwi, nukupuʻu, Kauaʻi ʻamakihi and ʻōʻū. Most of these birds are extinct. The hoary bat is found in the Kōkeʻe State Park on Kauaʻi, feral horses live in the Waipio Valley, feral cattle by the Mauna Kea, and the Australian brush-tailed rock-wallaby live by the Kalihi Valley on Oʻahu. The Hawaiian monk seal, feral goats, feral sheep, and feral pigs live throughout most of the archipelago.

In Hawaii, three species of sea turtles are considered native: honu, honu'ea and the leatherback sea turtle. Two other species, the loggerhead sea turtle and the olive ridley sea turtle, are sometimes observed in Hawaiian waters. The Hawaiian green sea turtle is the most common sea turtle in Hawaiian waters. As well as turtles, the sea life consist of more than forty species of shark and the Hawaiian spinner dolphin is widespread. Hawaii's coral reefs are home to over 5000 species, and 25 percent of these are found nowhere else in the world.

== Alaska ==
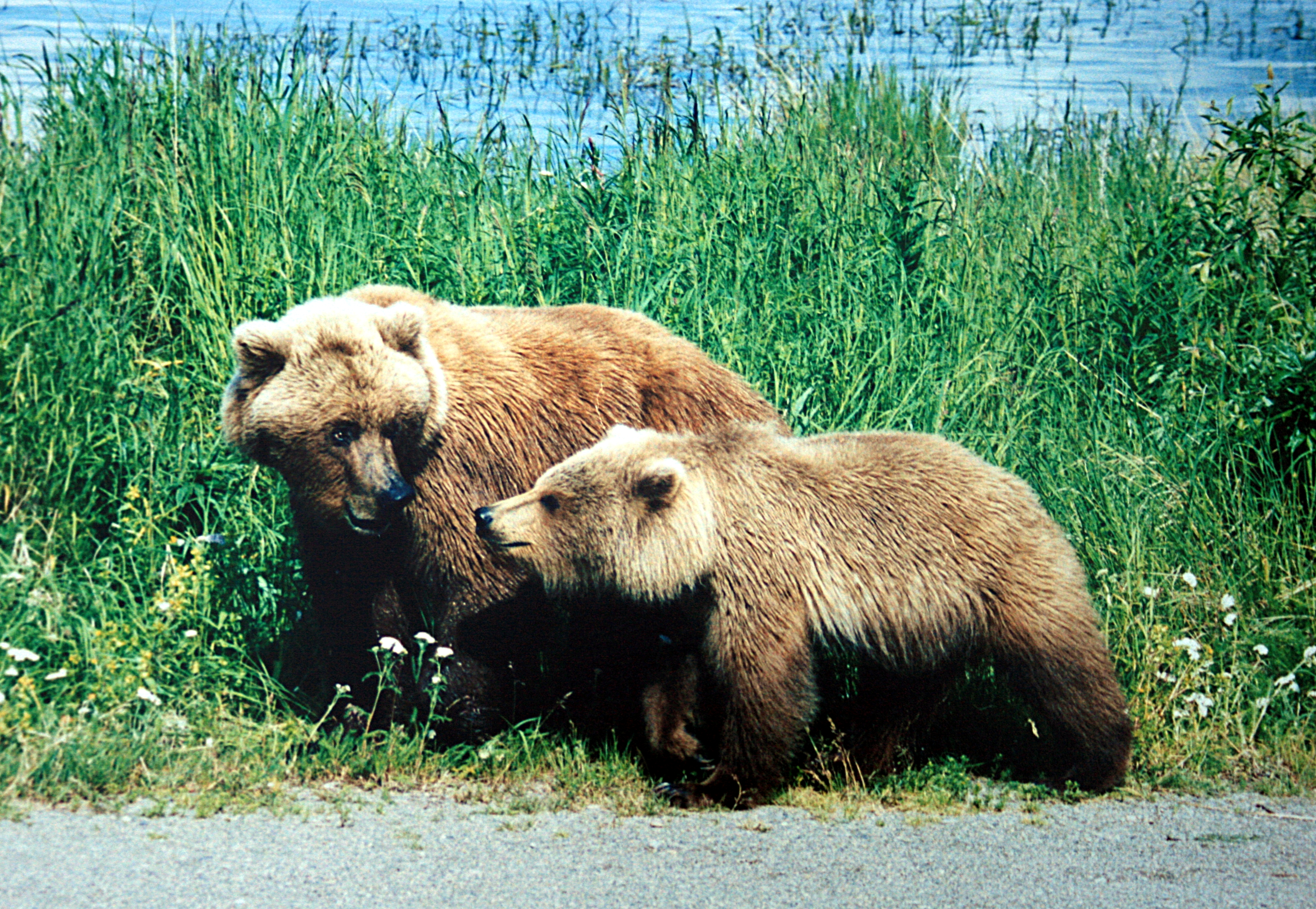
Grizzly bears are found throughout Alaska, parts of Montana and on the Canada–US border in Idaho. They are also found in Yellowstone National Park.

The wildlife of Alaska is abundant, extremely diverse and includes for instance polar bears, puffins, moose, bald eagles, Arctic foxes, wolves, Canadian lynx, muskox, snowshoe hare, mountain goats, walrus and caribou. Life zones in Alaska range from grasslands, mountains, tundra to thick forests, which leads to a huge diversity in terrain and geology throughout the state.

Alaska has also over 430 species of birds and the largest population of bald eagles in the nation. From pygmy shrews that weigh less than a penny to gray whales that weigh 45 tons, Alaska is the "Last Frontier" for animals as well as people. Many species endangered elsewhere are still abundant in Alaska.

=== Aleutian Islands ===
The Aleutian Islands are home to an abundance of large bird colonies; more than 240 bird species inhabit Alaska's Aleutian Archipelago. Large seabird colonies are present on islands like Buldir Island, which has 21 breeding seabird species, including the Bering Sea-endemic red-legged kittiwake. Large seabird colonies are also present on Kiska Island, Gareloi Island, Semisopochnoi Island, Bogoslof Island, and several others.

The islands are also frequented by vagrant Asiatic birds, including the common rosefinch, Siberian rubythroat, bluethroat, lanceolated warbler, and the first North American record of the intermediate egret. Other animals in the Aleutian Chain include the Arctic fox, American mink, Porcupine caribou, northern sea otter, horned puffin, tufted puffin, Steller sea lion, spotted seal, ringed seal, northern fur seal and many more.

== Territories ==
=== American Samoa ===
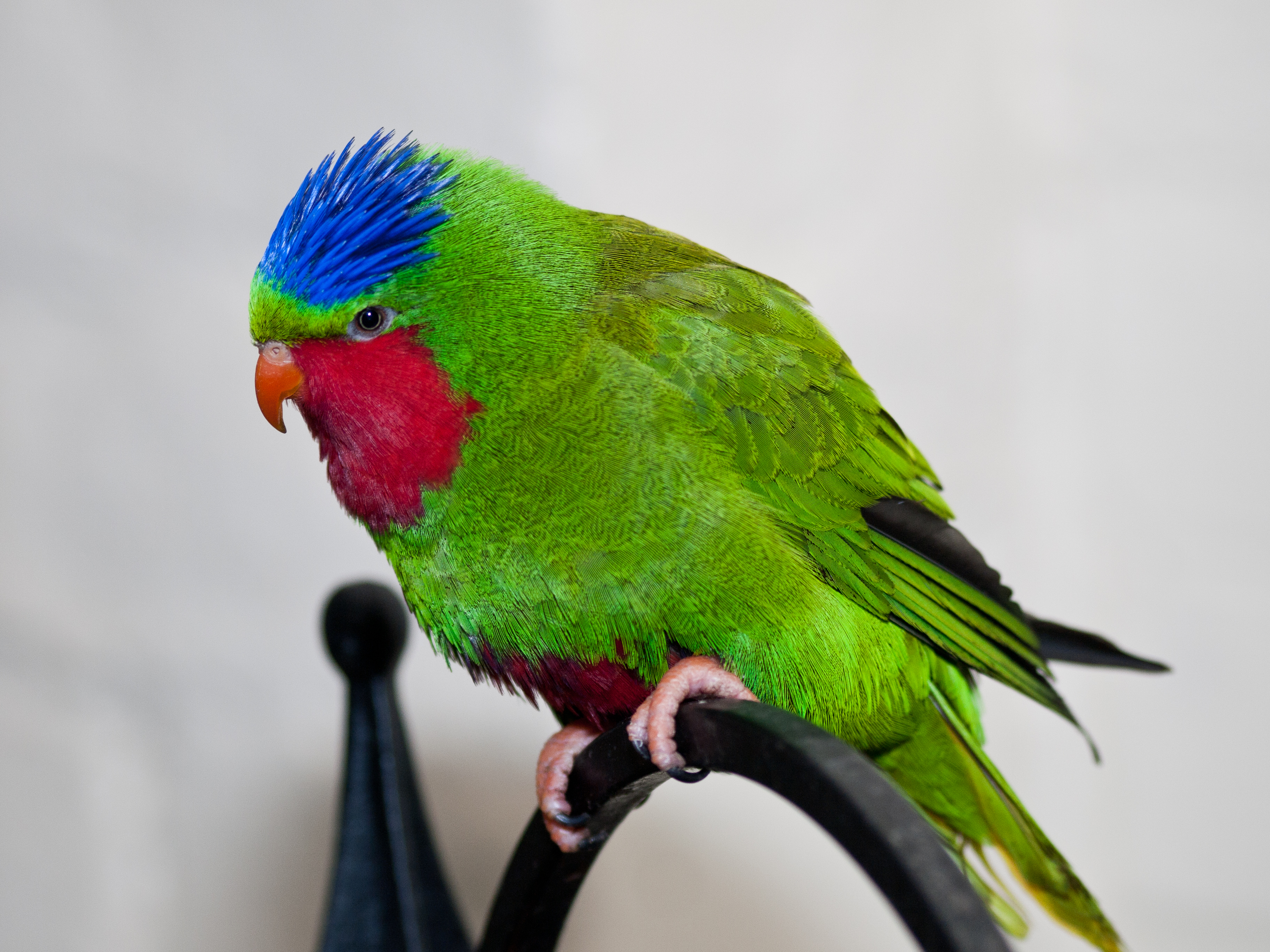
The blue-crowned lorikeet is a parrot found throughout the Samoan islands.

Because of its remote location, diversity among the terrestrial species is low. The archipelago has a huge variety in animals and more than 9,000 acres is a national park: National Park of American Samoa. The park stretches over three of the six islands in the archipelago: Tutuila, Ofu-Olosega and Ta'ū. Eight mammal species have been recorded at American Samoa, of which none of them are critically endangered. (Note: This list is derived from the IUCN Red List which lists species of mammals and includes those mammals that have recently been classified as extinct (since 1500 AD). The taxonomy and naming of the individual species is based on those used in existing Wikipedia articles as of 21 May 2007 and supplemented by the common names and taxonomy from the IUCN, Smithsonian Institution, or University of Michigan where no Wikipedia article was available.)

The mammals include three species of native bats, namely the Samoa flying fox, the insular flying fox and the Pacific sheath-tailed bat. The avifauna includes 65 species of bird where the more unusual distinctive ones are the blue-crowned lorikeet, the spotless crake, the many-colored fruit dove, the wattled honeyeater, tropical pigeons, the samoan starling, white tern, black noddy and the red-tailed tropicbird.

There are many reptiles in the islands, including five species of geckos, eight species of skinks and two species of snakes: the Pacific boa and the Australoasian blindsnake. The marine life is magnificent and much concentrated around the colorful coral reefs. The Samoan ocean is a home to sea turtles as hawksbill sea turtle, olive ridley sea turtle, leatherback sea turtle and the green sea turtle. Five species of dolphins live in the area: spinner dolphin, rough-toothed dolphin, bottlenose dolphin, pantropical spotted dolphin and striped dolphin.

=== Guam ===
Shortly after World War II, the brown tree snake was introduced to the island of Guam and caused much of the endemic wildlife to become extinct. Due to an abundance of prey species and lack of predators, the brown tree snake's population exploded and reached nearly 13,000 snakes per square mile at most. Ten out of twelve endemic bird species, ten lizards and two bats all became extinct as a result of the introduction of the brown tree snake. In recent years, a lot has been done by the U.S. government to decrease the number of brown tree snakes on the island. For instance in 2013, a $1 million program by the U.S. Fish and Wildlife Service dropped more than 2000 mice filled with poison on the island. In 2013, more than two million brown tree snakes were estimated to be on the island. Other introduced species include the Philippine deer, the Asiatic water buffalo, the marine toad and the giant African land snail. Several native species of skinks, geckos and a monitor lizard are still found on the island.

=== Northern Mariana Islands ===
The Commonwealth of Northern Mariana Islands is home to 40 indigenous and introduced bird species. Some endemic bird species are the Mariana fruit dove, the Mariana swiftlet, the Rota white-eye, the Tinian monarch, the bridled white-eye and the golden white-eye. Other common, but introduced species, include the collared kingfisher, the rufous fantail, the fairy tern and the uniform swiftlet. The Mariana fruit bat is endemic to both Guam and the Northern Mariana Islands. The sambar deer is the largest mammal and lives on several of the islands. The Mariana monitor, ranging up to 3 feet long, is also present on the island of Rota. The oceans are home to more than a thousand species of marine life, including for instance the coconut crabs, the mahi-mahi, the barracuda, tridacna, marlin and tuna.

=== Puerto Rico ===
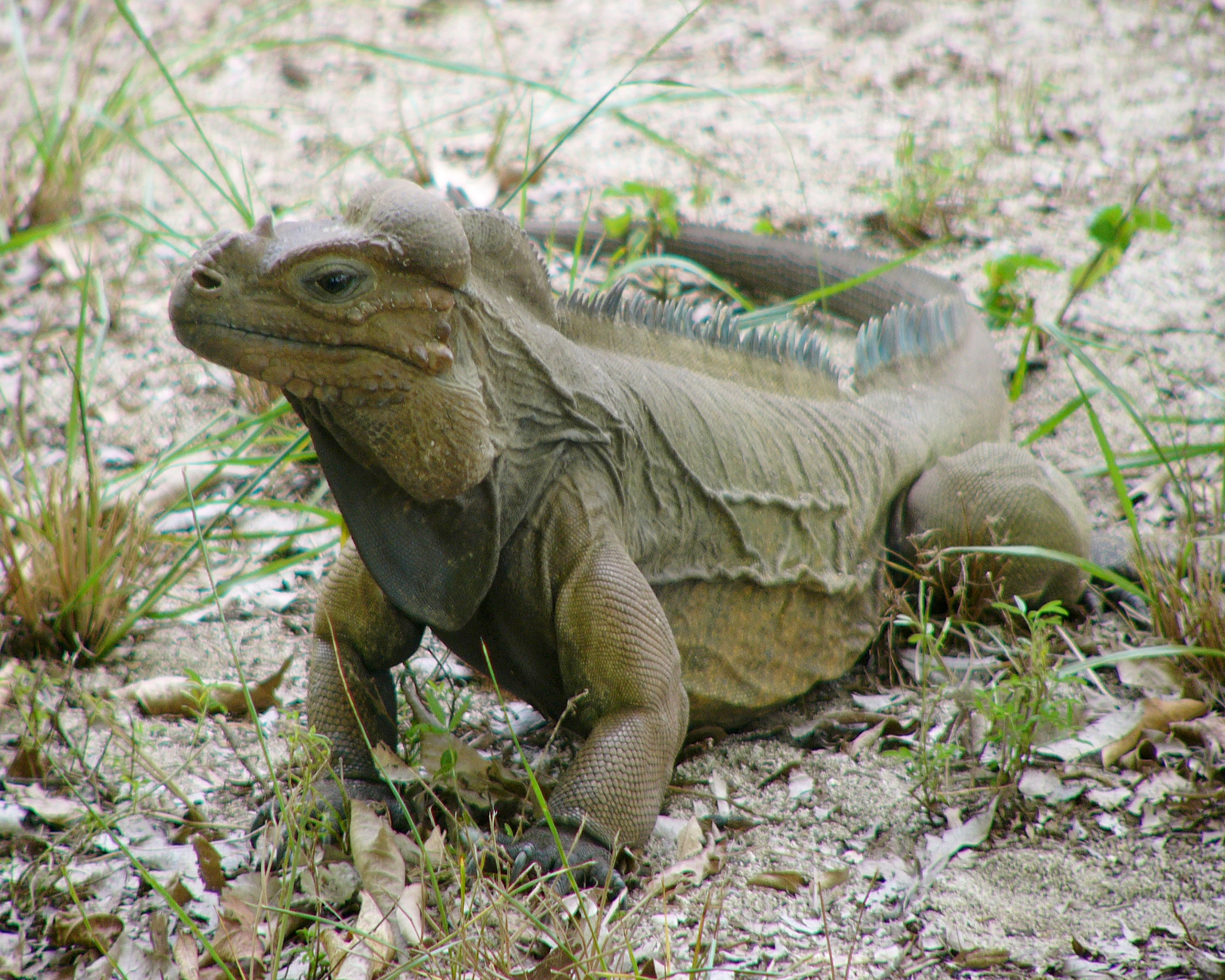
The Mona ground iguana is the largest native terrestrial lizard in Puerto Rico and is an endangered species.

Puerto Rico has 349 bird species, 83 mammals, 25 amphibians, 61 reptiles and 677 species of fish. Birds found nowhere else on earth include for instance the Puerto Rican owl, the Puerto Rican woodpecker, the Puerto Rican tody, the green mango, the Puerto Rican emerald, the Puerto Rican lizard cuckoo, the Puerto Rican nightjar and many more. All current endemic 13 land mammals are bats, which includes for instance the greater bulldog bat, the Antillean ghost-faced bat and the Parnell's mustached bat. Extinct native mammals include the plate-toothed giant hutia and the Puerto Rican cave rat. Reptiles unique to Puerto Rico include the Puerto Rican boa, the guanica blindsnake, the Mona Island iguana, the Puerto Rican worm lizard, the Puerto Rican galliwasp and the Nichols' dwarf gecko. Amphibians native to the island include the Puerto Rican crested toad, the common coqui, the locust coqui, the wrinkled coqui, the forest coqui, the elfin coqui and the bronze coqui. Endemic fish include the Puerto Rican snake eel and the Puerto Rico coralbrotula.

=== Virgin Islands ===
The Virgin Islands National Park covers approximately 60% of the Island of St. John and nearly all of Hassel Island. The national park has more than 140 species of birds, 302 species of fish, 7 species of amphibians and 22 species of mammals. The tropical Virgin Islands are home to a huge variety of wildlife, including many unique species endemic to the archipelago. There are three species of sea turtles in the USVI that inhabit the local waters and utilize beaches for nesting: the green sea turtle, the hawksbill sea turtle and the leatherback sea turtle. Several species of sharks, manatees and dolphins roam the seas.

== List of species in the United States ==
=== Mammals ===
Common name	Binomial name	Family	Image	Distribution area	Notes
ABC Islands bear	Ursus arctos sitkensis	Ursidae		ABC Islands	
Abert's squirrel	Sciurus aberti	Sciuridae		Western United States	
Agile kangaroo rat	Dipodomys agilis	Heteromyidae		South California	
Alaska marmot	Marmota broweri	Sciuridae		Alaska	
Alaska Peninsula brown bear	Ursus arctos gyas	Ursidae		Alaska Peninsula	
Alaska tiny shrew	Sorex yukonicus	Soricinae		Alaska	
Alaskan hare	Lepus othus	Leporidae		Alaska	
Alaskan tundra wolf	Canis lupus tundrarum	Canidae		Arctic Alaska	
Allen's big-eared bat	Idionycteris phyllotis	Vespertilionidae		mainly in Arizona; has been spotted in California, Colorado, Nevada, New Mexico, Utah	
American badger	Taxidea taxus	Mustelidae		Across the country except Alaska, Hawaii, New England Puerto Rico, Southern United States (excluding Texas) and the U.S. Virgin Islands	The Wisconsin state mammal
American bison	Bison bison	Bovidae		Alaska, Arizona and Montana	The Kansas, Oklahoma and Wyoming state mammal; the US national mammal
American black bear	Ursus americanus	Ursidae		Across the country except Hawaii, Puerto Rico and the U.S. Virgin Islands	The Alabama, Louisiana, New Mexico and West Virginia state mammal
American ermine	Mustela richardsonii	Mustelidae		Northeastern and Western United States	
American marten	Martes americana	Mustelidae		Across the country except Hawaii, Puerto Rico, Southwestern United States, Texas and the U.S. Virgin Islands	
American mink	Neogale vison	Mustelidae		Alaska, Michigan, New England, New York, Wisconsin	
American pika	Ochotona princeps	Ochotonidae		Western United States	
American pygmy shrew	Sorex hoyi	Soricinae		Alaska, the Appalachians, the Great Lakes, New England, the Rockies	
American red fox	Vulpes vulpen fulva	Canidae		Eastern United States	
American red squirrel	Tamiasciurus hudsonicus	Sciuridae		Alaska, Northeastern United States and the Rockies	
American shrew mole	Neurotrichus gibbsii	Talpinae		Pacific Coast	The smallest species of mole
American water shrew	Sorex palustris	Soricinae		Alaska, the Appalachians, Illinois, Michigan, Minnesota, New England, Western United States	The smallest mammalian diver
Antelope jackrabbit	Lepus alleni	Leporidae		Southern Arizona	
Antillean fruit-eating bat	Brachyphylla cavernarum	Mormoopidae		Puerto Rico, U.S. Virgin Islands	
Antillean ghost-faced bat	Mormoops blainvillei	Phyllostomidae		Puerto Rico	
Antillean manatee	Trichechus manatus manatus	Trichechidae		Puerto Rico	The largest sea cow species
Appalachian cottontail	Sylvilagus obscurus	Leporidae		The Appalachians	
Arctic fox	Vulpes lagopus	Canidae		Alaska	
Arctic ringed seal	Pusa hispida hispida	Phocidae		Alaska, New England	The most abundant and wide-ranging seal in the Northern Hemisphere
Arctic shrew	Sorex arcticus	Soricinae		Northern United States	
Arizona gray squirrel	Sciurus arizonensis	Sciuridae		Arizona	
Arizona myotis	Myotis occultus	Vespertilionidae		Southwestern United States	
Arizona pocket mouse	Perognathus amplus	Heteromyidae		Sonoran Desert	
Arizona shrew	Sorex arizonae	Soricinae		Arizona, New Mexico	
Atlantic white-sided dolphin	Lagenorhynchus acutus	Delphinidae		New England	
Attwater's pocket gopher	Geomys attwateri	Geomyidae		Texas Coastal Bend	
Avery Island white-tailed deer	Odocoileus virginianus mcilhennyi	Cervidae		Louisiana and South Texas	
Atlantic spotted dolphin	Stenella frontalis	Delphinidae		East Coast	
Bailey's pocket mouse	Chaetodipus baileyi	Heteromyidae		Arizona, California, New Mexico	
Baird's beaked whale	Berardius bairdii	Ziphiidae		West Coast	
Baird's pocket gopher	Geomys breviceps	Geomyidae		Arkansas, East Texas, Louisiana, Oklahoma	
Baird's shrew	Sorex bairdi	Soricinae		Oregon	
Baja pocket mouse	Chaetodipus rudinoris	Heteromyidae		Southern California and the Channel Islands	
Banner-tailed kangaroo rat	Dipodomys spectabilis	Heteromyidae		Southwestern United States	
Barren ground shrew	Sorex ugyunak	Soricinae		Alaska	
Bearded seal	Erignathus barbatus	Phocidae		Alaska	
Beech marten	Martes foina	Mustelidae		Wisconsin (introduced)	
Beluga whale	Delphinapterus leucas	Monodontidae		Alaska	
Beringian lemming	Lemmus nigripes	Cricetidae		Alaska	
Big brown bat	Eptesicus fuscus	Vespertilionidae		Contiguous United States	The District of Columbia state mammal
Big free-tailed bat	Nyctinomops macrotis	Molossidae		California, Nevada, Texas, Utah	
Blackbeard Island white-tailed deer	Odocoileus virginianus nigribarbis	Cervidae		Blackbeard Island National Wildlife Refuge	
Black-footed ferret	Mustela nigripes	Mustelidae		Western United States	
Black-tailed jackrabbit	Lepus californicus	Leporidae		Great Plains, Western and West North Central states; introduced in Maryland, New Jersey, and Virginia	
Black-tailed prairie dog	Cynomys ludovicianus	Sciuridae		Montana, North Dakota, South Dakota, Wyoming, Colorado, Nebraska, Kansas, Oklahoma, Texas, Arizona, and New Mexico	
Blainville's beaked whale	Mesoplodon densirostris	Ziphiidae		East and West Coast of the United States	
Blue whale	Balaenoptera musculus	Balaenopteridae		East and West Coast of the United States	
Bobcat	Lynx rufus	Felidae		Contiguous United States	The New Hampshire state wildcat
Botta's pocket gopher	Thomomys bottae	Geomyidae		Southwestern United States	
Bowhead whale	Balaena mysticetus	Balaenidae		Alaska	The Alaska state marine mammal
British Columbia red fox	Vulpes vulpen abietorum	Canidae		Alaskan Panhandle	
British Columbia wolf	Canis lupus columbianus	Canidae		Alaskan Panhandle, Alexander Archipelago	
Brush rabbit	Sylvilagus bachmani	Leporidae		The West Coast	
Bryde's whale	Balaenoptera brydei	Balaenopteridae		South Atlantic and Gulf of Mexico	
Bulls Island white-tailed deer	Odocoileus virginianus taurinsulae	Cervidae		Cape Romain National Wildlife Refuge	
California kangaroo rat	Dipodomys californicus	Heteromyidae		California, Oregon	
California sea lion	Zalophus californianus	Otariidae		West Coast	
Camas pocket gopher	Thomomys bulbivorus	Geomyidae		Willamette Valley	
Canadian lemming	Lemmus trimucronatus	Cricetidae		Alaska	
Canadian lynx	Lynx canadensis	Felidae		Alaska, Colorado, Idaho, Maine, Minnesota, Montana, Utah, Washington	
Canyon bat	Parastrellus hesperus	Vespertilionidae		Western United States	The smallest bat in the United States
Carabao	Bubalus bubalis kerabau	Bovidae		Guam	
Cave myotis	Myotis velifer	Vespertilionidae		Arizona, Kansas, Oklahoma, Texas	
Cascade golden-mantled ground squirrel	Callospermophilus saturatus	Sciuridae		The Cascades	
Cascade red fox	Vulpes vulpen cascadensis	Canidae		Washington	
California leaf-nosed bat	Macrotus californicus	Phyllostomidae		Sonoran and Mojave deserts	
California mule deer	Odocoileus hemionus californicus	Cervidae		California	
California myotis	Myotis californicus	Vespertilionidae		Western United States	
California pocket mouse	Chaetodipus californicus	Heteromyidae		Southern California	
California vole	Microtus californicus	Cricetidae		California and Oregon	
Carmen Mountains white-tailed deer	Odocoileus virginianus carminis	Cervidae		South Texas	
Central Texas pocket gopher	Geomys texensis	Geomyidae		Central Texas	
Chihuahuan pocket mouse	Chaetodipus eremicus	Heteromyidae		Southwestern United States	
Chisel-toothed kangaroo rat	Dipodomys microps	Heteromyidae		Arizona, California, Idaho, Nevada, Oregon, Utah	
Cinereus shrew	Sorex cinereus	Soricinae		Alaska, Northern United States, Northwestern United States	The most widely distributed shrew in North America
Clymene dolphin	Stenella clymene	Delphinidae		East Coast	
Coast mole	Scapanus orarius	Scalopinae		Pacific Northwest	
Cockrum's gray shrew	Notiosorex cockrumi	Soricinae		Arizona	
Collared peccary	Dicotyles tajacu	Tayassuidae		Arizona, New Mexico and Texas	
Collared pika	Ochotona collaris	Ochotonidae		Alaska	
Columbian black-tailed deer	Odocoileus hemionus columbianus	Cervidae		Kauai, Pacific Northwest	
Columbian white-tailed deer	Odocoileus virginianus leucurus	Cervidae		Oregon, Washington	
Common bottlenose dolphin	Tursiops truncatus	Delphinidae		East and California	The Florida and South Carolina state salt water mammal
Common dolphin	Delphinus delphis	Delphinidae		East and California	
Common minke whale	Balaenoptera acutorostrata	Balaenopteridae		East and West Coast of the United States	
Coues' white-tailed deer	Odocoileus virginianus couesi	Cervidae		Arizona	
Cougar	Puma concolor	Felidae		Western United States	The most widely distributed wild, terrestrial mammal in the Western Hemisphere
Coyote	Canis latrans	Canidae		Across the country	The South Dakota state mammal
Crawford's gray shrew	Notiosorex crawfordi	Soricinae		Southwestern United States	
Creeping vole	Microtus oregoni	Cricetidae		Pacific Northwest	
Cuvier's beaked whale	Ziphius cavirostris	Ziphiidae		East and West Coast of the United States	
Dakota white-tailed deer	Odocoileus virginianus dacotensis	Cervidae		Colorado, the Dakotas, Minnesota, Montana, Wyoming	
Dall Island black bear	Ursus americanus pugnax	Ursidae		Dall Island	
Dall Island brown bear	Ursus arctos dalli	Ursidae		Dall Island	
Dall sheep	Ovis dalli dalli	Bovidae		Alaska	
Dall's porpoise	Phocoenoides dalli	Phocoenidae		West Coast of the United States	
Dark kangaroo mouse	Microdipodops megacephalus	Heteromyidae		California and Nevada	
Desert bighorn sheep	Ovis canadensis nelsoni	Bovidae		Southwestern United States	The Nevada state mammal
Desert cottontail	Sylvilagus audubonii	Leporidae		Western United States	
Desert kangaroo rat	Dipodomys deserti	Heteromyidae		Southwestern United States	
Desert mule deer	Odocoileus hemionus eremicus	Cervidae		Southwestern United States	
Desert pocket gopher	Geomys arenarius	Geomyidae		New Mexico, Texas	
Desert pocket mouse	Chaetodipus penicillatus	Heteromyidae		Southwestern United States	
Douglas squirrel	Tamiasciurus douglasii	Sciuridae		Western United States	
Dugong	Dugong dugon	Dugongidae		The Northern Mariana Islands	
Dulzura kangaroo rat	Dipodomys simulans	Heteromyidae		California	
Dwarf shrew	Sorex nanus	Soricinae		Mountain States	
Dwarf sperm whale	Kogia sima	Kogiidae		East and West Coast of the United States	
Eastern black bear	Ursus americanus americanus	Ursidae		Across the country except Hawaii, Puerto Rico and the U.S. Virgin Islands	
Eastern cottontail	Sylvilagus floridanus	Leporidae		Eastern Midwestern, South-Central and Southwestern United States; introduced in New England, Oregon and Washington	The most common rabbit species in North America
Eastern gray squirrel	Sciurus carolinensis	Sciuridae		Eastern United States	
Eastern meadow vole	Microtus pennsylvanicus	Cricetidae		Northern United States and Mountain States	
Eastern mole	Scalopus aquaticus	Scalopinae		Eastern United States, Lower Midwest, Southern United States	
Eastern red bat	Lasiurus borealis	Vespertilionidae		Eastern United States and Midwestern United States	
Eastern small-footed myotis	Myotis leibii	Vespertilionidae		Eastern United States	
Eastern wolf	Canis lycaon	Canidae		Great Lakes, New England	
Elk	Cervus canadensis	Cervidae		Contiguous United States	
Elliot's short-tailed shrew	Blarina hylophaga	Soricinae		Arkansas, Colorado, Iowa, Kansas, Louisiana, Missouri, Nebraska, Oklahoma, Texas	
European hare	Lepus europaeus	Leporidae		New York (introduced)	
European red fox	Vulpes vulpen crucigera	Canidae		Across the country (introduced)	
Evening bat	Nycticeius humeralis	Vespertilionidae		Midwestern and Southern United States	
Everglades short-tailed shrew	Blarina peninsulae	Soricinae		Florida	
False killer whale	Pseudorca crassidens	Delphinidae		East and West Coast of the United States	
Fin whale	Balaenoptera physalus	Balaenopteridae		East and West Coast of the United States	
Fisher	Pekania pennanti	Mustelidae		Alaska, the Appalachians, Great Lakes, New England, Pacific Northwest	
Florida bonneted bat	Eumops floridanus	Molossidae		Florida	
Florida coastal white-tailed deer	Odocoileus virginianus osceola	Cervidae		Coasts of Alabama, Florida and Mississippi	
Florida manatee	Trichechus manatus latirostris	Trichechidae		Florida; has been spotted in New England, the Gulf of Mexico and near the confluence of the Wolf and Mississippi rivers in Memphis	The largest sea cow species; The Alabama and Florida state marine mammal
Florida panther	Puma concolor coryi	Felidae		Florida	The Florida state mammal
Florida salt marsh vole	Microtus dukecampbelli	Cricetidae		Florida	
Florida white-tailed deer	Odocoileus virginianus seminolus	Cervidae		Florida	
Fog shrew	Sorex sonomae	Soricinae		California, Oregon	
Fox squirrel	Sciurus niger	Sciuridae		Eastern and Midwestern United States	
Fraser's dolphin	Lagenodelphis hosei	Delphinidae		Gulf of Mexico and Florida	
Fresno kangaroo rat	Dipodomys nitratoides	Heteromyidae		San Joaquin Valley	
Fringed myotis	Myotis thysanodes	Vespertilionidae		Western United States	
Gervais's beaked whale	Mesoplodon europaeus	Ziphiidae		East Coast	
Ghost-faced bat	Mormoops megalophylla	Mormoopidae		South Texas	
Giant kangaroo rat	Dipodomys ingens	Heteromyidae		California	
Ginkgo-toothed beaked whale	Mesoplodon ginkgodens	Ziphiidae		California	
Glacier Bay water shrew	Sorex alaskanus	Soricinae		Alaska	
Golden-mantled ground squirrel	Callospermophilus lateralis	Sciuridae		Western United States	
Gray bat	Myotis grisescens	Vespertilionidae		East South Central States, Lower Midwest	
Gray fox	Urocyon cinereoargenteus	Canidae		Across the country	The Delaware state mammal
Gray seal	Halichoerus grypus	Phocidae		New England	
Gray-tailed vole	Microtus canicaudus	Cricetidae		Washington and Oregon	
Gray whale	Eschrichtius robustus	Eschrichtiidae		West Coast	The California state marine mammal
Great Basin pocket mouse	Perognathus parvus	Heteromyidae		Great Basin	
Great Plains wolf	Canis lupus nubilus	Canidae		Michigan, Minnesota, North Dakota, Wisconsin	
Greater bulldog bat	Noctilio leporinus	Noctilionidae		Puerto Rico, U.S. Virgin Islands	
Greater long-nosed bat	Leptonycteris nivalis	Phyllostomidae		Southern Arizona, south New Mexico, South Texas	
Grizzly bear	Ursus arctos horribilis	Ursidae		Alaska, Pacific Northwest	The Montana state mammal
Groundhog	Marmota monax	Sciuridae		Alaska, Eastern United States, Idaho	
Guadalupe fur seal	Arctocephalus townsendi	Otariidae		Channel Islands	
Gulf Coast kangaroo rat	Dipodomys compactus	Heteromyidae		Texas	
Gunnison's prairie dog	Cynomys gunnisoni	Sciuridae		Utah, Colorado, Arizona and New Mexico	
Haida ermine	Mustela haidarum	Mustelidae		Alexander Archipelago	
Haida Gwaii black bear	Ursus americanus carlottae	Ursidae		Across the country except Hawaii, Puerto Rico and the U.S. Virgin Islands	
Hairy-tailed mole	Parascalops breweri	Scalopinae		Northeastern United States; extends into the Mid-South	
Hall's pocket gopher	Geomys jugossicularis	Geomyidae		Colorado, Kansas, and Nebraska	
Harbor seal	Phoca vitulina	Phocidae		West and East Coast of the United States	The Rhode Island state marine mammal
Harbour porpoise	Phocoena phocoena	Phocoenidae		The Rhode Island East and West Coast of the United States	
Harris's antelope squirrel	Ammospermophilus harrisii	Sciuridae		Arizona, New Mexico	
Hawaiian hoary bat	Lasiurus semotus	Vespertilionidae		Hawaii	The Hawaii state land mammal
Hawaiian monk seal	Neomonachus schauinslandi	Phocidae		Hawaii	The Hawaii state mammal
Heermann's kangaroo rat	Dipodomys heermanni	Heteromyidae		California	
Hilton Head white-tailed deer	Odocoileus virginianus hiltonensis	Cervidae		Hilton Head Island	
Hispid pocket mouse	Chaetodipus hispidus	Heteromyidae		Great Plains	
Hoary bat	Lasiurus cinereus	Vespertilionidae		Across the country	
Hoary marmot	Marmota monax	Sciuridae		Alaska, Montana, Washington	
Hualapai mexican vole	Microtus mexicanus hualapaiensis	Cricetidae		Hualapai Mountains	
Hubb's beaked whale	Mesoplodon carlhubbsi	Ziphiidae		West Coast	
Humboldt's flying squirrel	Glaucomys oregonensis	Sciuridae		California, Nevada, Oregon, and Washington	
Humpback whale	Megaptera novaeangliae	Balaenopteridae		East and West Coast	The Hawaii state marine mammal
Hunting Island white-tailed deer	Odocoileus virginianus venatorius	Cervidae		Hunting Island	
Idaho pocket gopher	Thomomys idahoensis	Geomyidae		Idaho, Montana, Utah, Wyoming	
Indiana bat	Myotis sodalis	Vespertilionidae		Eastern and Southern United States	
Insular flying fox	Pteropus tonganus	Pteropodidae		American Samoa	
Insular myotis	Myotis insularum	Vespertilionidae		American Samoa	
Insular vole	Microtus abbreviatus	Cricetidae		St. Matthew Island and Hall Island	
Interior Alaskan wolf	Canis lupus pambasileus	Canidae		Alaska	
Inyo mule deer	Odocoileus hemionus inyoensis	Cervidae		Central California	
Inyo shrew	Sorex tenellus	Soricinae		California, Nevada	
Island fox	Urocyon littoralis	Canidae		Channel Islands	
Jamaican fruit bat	Artibeus jamaicensis	Phyllostomidae		Puerto Rico, U.S. Virgin Islands	
Kansas white-tailed deer	Odocoileus virginianus macrourus	Cervidae		Arkansas, Iowa, Kansas, Louisiana, Missouri, Nebraska, South Dakota and Texas	The Arkansas state mammal
Keen's myotis	Myotis keenii	Vespertilionidae		Alaska, Washington	
Kenai black bear	Ursus americanus perniger	Ursidae		Kenai Peninsula	
Kenai red fox	Vulpes vulpen kenaiensis	Canidae		Kenai Peninsula	
Key deer	Odocoileus virginianus clavium	Cervidae		Florida Keys	
Kit fox	Vulpes macrotis	Canidae		Southwestern United States	
Knox Jones's pocket gopher	Geomys knoxjonesi	Geomyidae		New Mexico and Texas	
Kodiak bear	Ursus arctos middendorffi	Ursidae		Kodiak Islands	The second largest species of bear after polar bears
Kodiak red fox	Vulpes vulpen harrimani	Canidae		Kodiak Island	
Leach's single leaf bat	Monophyllus redmani	Phyllostomidae		Puerto Rico	
Least weasel	Mustela nivalis	Mustelidae		Alaska, Great Plains, Northeastern United States	
Lesser long-nosed bat	Leptonycteris yerbabuenae	Phyllostomidae		Southern Arizona, South California, South New Mexico,	
Little brown bat	Myotis lucifugus	Vespertilionidae		Everywhere except Florida, Hawaii, Louisiana, Southwestern United States, Texas	
Little pocket mouse	Perognathus longimembris	Heteromyidae		Western United States	
Long-eared myotis	Myotis evotis	Vespertilionidae		Western United States	
Long-finned pilot whale	Globicephala melas	Delphinidae		East Coast	
Long-legged myotis	Myotis volans	Vespertilionidae		Western United States	
Long-tailed pocket mouse	Chaetodipus formosus	Heteromyidae		Arizona, California, Nevada and Utah	
Long-tailed shrew	Sorex dispar	Soricinae		Northeastern United States	
Long-tailed vole	Microtus longicaudus	Cricetidae		Western United States	
Long-tailed weasel	Neogale frenata	Mustelidae		The Contiguous United States	
Louisiana black bear	Ursus americanus luteolus	Ursidae		East Texas, Louisiana and Mississippi	
Lower Keys marsh rabbit	Sylvilagus palustris hefneri	Leporidae		Florida Keys	
Manitoban elk	Cervus canadensis manitobensis	Cervidae		North Carolina, North Dakota	
Mariana fruit bat	Pteropus mariannus	Pteropodidae		Guam, the Northern Mariana Islands	
Marsh rabbit	Sylvilagus palustris	Leporidae		Florida; coasts of the Carolinas	
Marsh shrew	Sorex bendirii	Soricinae		West Coast	
Mazama pocket gopher	Thomomys mazama	Geomyidae		Pacific Northwest	
Melon-headed whale	Peponocephala electra	Delphinidae		Gulf of Mexico	
Merriam's kangaroo rat	Dipodomys merriami	Heteromyidae		Southwestern United States	
Merriam's pocket mouse	Perognathus merriami	Heteromyidae		New Mexico, Oklahoma, Texas	
Merriam's shrew	Sorex merriami	Soricinae		Western United States	
Mexican fox squirrel	Sciurus nayaritensis	Sciuridae		Arizona	
Mexican free-tailed bat	Tadarida brasiliensis	Molossidae		Southern United States, Southwestern United States	The Oklahoma and Texas state flying mammal
Mexican gray squirrel	Sciurus aureogaster	Sciuridae		Florida Keys (introduced)	
Mexican ground squirrel	Ictidomys mexicanus	Sciuridae		New Mexico and Texas	
Mexican spiny pocket mouse	Heteromys irroratus	Heteromyidae		South Texas	
Mexican wolf	Canis lupus baileyi	Canidae		Arizona, New Mexico	
Miller's long-tongued bat	Glossophaga longirostris	Phyllostomidae		U.S. Virgin Islands	
Minor red bat	Lasiurus minor	Vespertilionidae		Puerto Rico	
Montane shrew	Sorex monticolus	Soricinae		Alaska, Western United States	Texas state flying mammal
Montane vole	Microtus montanus	Cricetidae		Western United States	
Moose	Alces alces	Cervidae		Alaska, Idaho, New England, New York, North Dakota, Oregon, the Rockies, Upper Peninsula of Michigan, Washington, Wisconsin, Wyoming	The tallest, largest and heaviest species of deer and the tallest and second largest mammal in North America; The Alaska state land mammal and the Maine state mammal
Mount Graham red squirrel	Tamiasciurus fremonti grahamensis	Sciuridae		Pinaleño Mountains	
Mount Lyell shrew	Sorex lyelli	Soricinae		Mount Lyell	
Mountain beaver	Aplodontia rufa	Aplodontiidae		California, Nevada, Oregon and Washington	
Mountain cottontail	Sylvilagus nuttallii	Leporidae		Western United States	
Mountain goat	Oreamnos americanus	Bovidae		Alaska, Colorado, Idaho, Montana, Nevada, Oregon, South Dakota, Utah, Washington, Wyoming	
Mountain pocket gopher	Thomomys monticola	Geomyidae		California and Nevada	
Mule deer	Odocoileus hemionus	Cervidae		Western United States	
Muskox	Ovibos moschatus	Bovidae		Alaska	
Narrow-faced kangaroo rat	Dipodomys venustus	Heteromyidae		California	
Nelson's collared lemming	Dicrostonyx nelsoni	Cricetidae		Alaska	
Nelson's pocket mouse	Chaetodipus nelsoni	Heteromyidae		New Mexico and Texas	
New England cottontail	Sylvilagus transitionalis	Leporidae		New England	
New Mexico black bear	Ursus americanus altifrontalis	Ursidae		Arizona, Colorado, New Mexico, Utah and West Texas	
New Mexico shrew	Sorex neomexicanus	Soricinae		New Mexico	
Mexican long-nosed armadillo	Dasypus novemcinctus	Dasypodidae		Southern United States	The only species of armadillo that inhabits the United States; The Texas state small mammal
North American beaver	Castor canadensis	Castoridae		Across the contiguous United States	The New York and Oregon state mammal
North American cougar	Puma concolor couguar	Felidae		Western United States	
North American least shrew	Cryptotis parva	Soricinae		Central United States, Eastern United States	
North American porcupine	Erethizon dorsatum	Erethizontidae		Alaska, Contiguous United States except the South	
North American river otter	Lontra canadensis	Mustelidae		Alaska, Eastern United States, Northern California, Pacific Northwest	
North American water vole	Microtus pinetorum	Cricetidae		Northwestern United States	
North Atlantic humpback whale	Megaptera novaeangliae novaeangliae	Balaenopteridae		East Coast	
North Atlantic minke whale	Balaenoptera acutorostrata acutorostrata	Balaenopteridae		East Coast	
North Atlantic right whale	Eubalaena glacialis	Balaenidae		East Coast	The Georgia and Massachusetts state marine mammal and the South Carolina state migratory marine mammal
North Pacific fin whale	Balaenoptera physalus velifera	Balaenopteridae		West Coast	
North Pacific humpback whale	Megaptera novaeangliae kuzira	Balaenopteridae		West Coast	
North Pacific minke whale	Balaenoptera acutorostrata scammoni	Balaenopteridae		West Coast	
North Pacific right whale	Eubalaena japonica	Balaenidae		Alaska	
Northern Alaskan red fox	Vulpes vulpen alascensis	Canidae		Yukon Delta National Wildlife Refuge	
Northern blue whale	Balaenoptera musculus musculus	Balaenopteridae		Alaska, New England, West Coast	
Northern bog lemming	Synaptomys borealis	Cricetidae		Alaska, Idaho, Maine, Montana, New Hampshire, Vermont and Washington	
Northern bottlenose whale	Hyperoodon ampullatus	Ziphiidae		New England	
Northern broad-footed mole	Scapanus latimanus	Scalopinae		California, Nevada, Oregon	
Northern collared lemming	Dicrostonyx groenlandicus	Cricetidae		Alaska	
Northern elephant seal	Mirounga angustirostris	Phocidae		Alaska, West Coast, Northern Mariana Islands	
Northern fin whale	Balaenoptera physalus physalus	Balaenopteridae		East Coast and West Coast of the United States	
Northern flying squirrel	Glaucomys sabrinus	Sciuridae		Alaska, the Appalachians, Great Lakes, New England, and Western United States	
Northern fur seal	Callorhinus ursinus	Otariidae		Alaska, West Coast	
Northern long-eared bat	Myotis septentrionalis	Vespertilionidae		Eastern United States	
Northern plains red fox	Vulpes vulpen regalis	Canidae		Elk River	
Northern pocket gopher	Thomomys monticola	Geomyidae		Northwestern United States	
Northern red-backed vole	Clethrionomys rutilus	Cricetidae		Alaska	
Northern right whale dolphin	Lissodelphis borealis	Delphinidae		West Coast	
Northern short-tailed shrew	Blarina brevicauda	Soricinae		Central United States, Eastern United States	
Northern white-tailed deer	Odocoileus virginianus borealis	Cervidae		Northeastern United States	The Illinois, New Hampshire, Ohio, Pennsylvania and Wisconsin state mammal and the Michigan state game mammal
Northern yellow bat	Lasiurus intermedius	Vespertilionidae		Gulf Coast	
Northwestern white-tailed deer	Odocoileus virginianus ochrourus	Cervidae		Western United States	
Northwestern wolf	Canis lupus occidentalis	Canidae		Alaska, Northwestern United States	
Nutria	Myocastor coypus	Echimyidae		Contiguous United States (introduced)	
Ocelot	Leopardus pardalis	Felidae		Arizona and Texas	
Olived-backed pocket mouse	Perognathus fasciatus	Heteromyidae		Great Plains	
Olympic black bear	Ursus americanus altifrontalis	Ursidae		Pacific Northwest	
Olympic marmot	Marmota olympus	Sciuridae		Olympic National Park	
Olympic shrew	Sorex rohweri	Soricinae		Olympic National Park	
Orca	Orcinus orca	Delphinidae		East and West Coast of the United States	The Washington state marine mammal
Ord's kangaroo rat	Dipodomys ordii	Heteromyidae		The Great Plains and the Great Basin	
Oregon pronghorn	Antilocapra americana oregona	Antilocapridae		Oregon	
Ornate shrew	Sorex ornatus	Soricinae		California	
Ozark big-eared bat	Corynorhinus townsendii ingens	Vespertilionidae		Arkansas, Missouri and Oklahoma	
Pacific common seal	Phoca vitulina richardii	Phocidae		West Coast	
Pacific marten	Martes caurina	Mustelidae		Western United States	
Pacific sheath-tailed bat	Emballonura semicaudata	Emballonuridae		American Samoa, Guam	
Pacific shrew	Sorex pacificus	Soricinae		Oregon	
Pacific white-sided dolphin	Lagenorhynchus acutus	Delphinidae		West Coast	
Pale kangaroo mouse	Microdipodops pallidus	Heteromyidae		California and Nevada	
Pallid bat	Antrozous pallidus	Vespertilionidae		Western United States	The state bat of California
Panamint kangaroo rat	Dipodomys panamintus	Heteromyidae		The Mojave Desert	
Pantropical spotted dolphin	Stenella attenuata	Delphinidae		East Coast	
Parnell's moustached bat	Pteronotus parnellii portoricensis	Mormoopidae		Puerto Rico	
Perrin's beaked whale	Mesoplodon perrini	Ziphiidae		California	
Philippine deer	Rusa marianna	Cervidae		Guam, the Northern Mariana Islands	
Plains bison	Bison bison bison	Bovidae		Alaska, Arizona and Montana	
Plains pocket gopher	Geomys bursarius	Geomyidae		Great Plains	
Plains pocket mouse	Perognathus flavescens	Heteromyidae		Central and Western United States	
Pocketed free-tailed bat	Nyctinomops femorosaccus	Molossidae		Arizona, California, New Mexico, Texas	
Polar bear	Ursus maritimus	Ursidae		Arctic Alaska	The largest bear species
Porcupine caribou	Rangifer arcticus arcticus	Cervidae		Alaska	
Prairie shrew	Sorex haydeni	Soricinae		Midwestern United States	
Prairie vole	Microtus ochrogaster	Cricetidae		Central United States	
Preble's shrew	Sorex preblei	Soricinae		Great Basin	
Pribilof Island shrew	Sorex hydrodromus/pribilofensis	Soricinae		Pribilof Islands	
Pronghorn	Antilocapra americana	Antilocapridae		Arizona, Colorado, Idaho, Kansas, Montana, Nebraska, Nevada, New Mexico, North Dakota, Northern California, Oklahoma, Oregon, South Dakota, Texas, Utah, Washington and Wyoming	Τhe fastest land mammal in the Western Hemisphere
Pygmy killer whale	Feresa attenuata	Delphinidae		East Coast	
Pygmy rabbit	Brachylagus idahoensis	Leporidae		Great Basin	The world's smallest rabbit
Pygmy sperm whale	Kogia breviceps	Kogiidae		East and West Coast of the United States	
Raccoon	Procyon lotor	Procyonidae		Across the country except Alaska, Hawaii, Puerto Rico and the U.S. Virgin Islands	The Tennessee state mammal and the Oklahoma state furbearer
Rafinesque's big-eared bat	Corynorhinus rafinesquii	Vespertilionidae		Southeastern United States	
Red fox	Vulpes vulpen	Canidae		Across the country except Hawaii, Puerto Rico and the U.S. Virgin Islands	
Red fruit bat	Stenoderma rufum	Phyllostomidae		Puerto Rico, U.S. Virgin Islands	
Red tree vole	Arborimus longicaudus	Cricetidae		California and Oregon	
Red wolf	Canis rufus	Canidae		Southeastern United States	
Reindeer	Rangifer tarandus	Cervidae		Alaska, Idaho, Montana and Washington	
Rhesus macaque	Macaca mulatta	Cercopithecidae		Florida, South Carolina, Puerto Rico	
Ribbon seal	Histriophoca fasciata	Phocidae		Alaska	
Rice's whale	Balaenoptera ricei	Balaenopteridae		Gulf of Mexico	
Ringed seal	Pusa hispida	Phocidae		Alaska, New England	
Ringtail	Bassariscus astutus	Procyonidae		Southwestern United States, West South Central states	The Arizona state mammal
Rio Grande ground squirrel	Ictidomys parvidens	Sciuridae		New Mexico and Texas	
Risso's dolphin	Grampus griseus	Delphinidae		East and West Coast of the United States	
Robust cottontail	Sylvilagus holzneri	Leporidae		Arizona, New Mexico, West Texas	
Rock pocket mouse	Chaetodipus intermedius	Heteromyidae		Southwestern United States	
Rock vole	Microtus chrotorrhinus	Cricetidae		The Appalachians and New England	
Rocky Mountains bighorn sheep	Ovis canadensis canadensis	Bovidae		The Rockies and Northwestern United States	The Colorado state mammal
Rocky Mountain elk	Cervus canadensis nelsoni	Cervidae		The Rockies	The Utah state mammal
Rocky Mountains mule deer	Odocoileus hemionus hemionus	Cervidae		The Rockies	
Roosevelt elk	Cervus canadensis roosevelti	Cervidae		Kodiak Archipelago, Pacific Northwest	
Rough-toothed dolphin	Steno bredanensis	Delphinidae		East and West Coast of the United States	
Sagebrush vole	Lemmiscus curtatus	Cricetidae		Western United States	
Saint Lawrence Island shrew	Sorex jacksoni	Soricinae		St. Lawrence Island	
Samoa flying fox	Pteropus samoensis	Pteropodidae		American Samoa	
San Joaquin antelope squirrel	Ammospermophilus nelsoni	Sciuridae		San Joaquin Valley	
San Joaquin kit fox	Vulpes macrotis mutica	Canidae		Central California	
San Joaquin pocket mouse	Perognathus inornatus	Heteromyidae		California	
Sand Hills pocket gopher	Geomys lutescens	Geomyidae		Colorado, Nebraska, South Dakota, and Wyoming	
Sea otter	Enhydra lutris	Mustelidae		Alaska, the West Coast	
Sei whale	Balaenoptera borealis	Balaenopteridae		East and West Coast of the United States	
Selkirk Mountains caribou	Rangifer arcticus montanus	Cervidae		Idaho, Montana, Washington	
Seminole bat	Lasiurus seminolus	Vespertilionidae		Southern United States	
Short-finned pilot whale	Globicephala macrorhynchus	Delphinidae		East and West Coast of the United States	
Sierra Nevada bighorn sheep	Ovis canadensis sierrae	Bovidae		The Sierra Nevada	
Sierra Nevada red fox	Vulpes vulpen necator	Canidae		The Cascades and the Sierra Nevada	
Silky pocket mouse	Perognathus flavus	Heteromyidae		Southwestern United States	
Silver-haired bat	Lasionycteris noctivagans	Vespertilionidae		Across the country except Hawaii, Puerto Rico and the U.S. Virgin Islands	
Singing vole	Microtus miurus	Cricetidae		Alaska	
Sitka black-tailed deer	Odocoileus hemionus sitkensis	Cervidae		Alaskan Panhandle	
Smoky shrew	Sorex fumeus	Soricinae		Northeastern United States	
Snowshoe hare	Lepus americanus	Leporidae		Alaska, the Appalachians, the Cascades, Michigan, Minnesota, New England, the Rockies, the Sierra Nevada, Wisconsin	
Sonoma tree vole	Arborimus pomo	Cricetidae		Northern California	
Sonoran pronghorn	Antilocapra americana sonoriensis	Antilocapridae		Sonoran Desert	
Sooty mustached bat	Pteronotus quadridens	Mormoopidae		Puerto Rico	
Southeastern myotis	Myotis austroriparius	Vespertilionidae		Gulf Coast, Mid-South (region)	
Southeastern pocket gopher	Geomys pinetis	Geomyidae		Alabama, Georgia, and Florida	
Southeastern shrew	Sorex longirostris	Soricinae		Southeastern United States	
Southern bog lemming	Synaptomys cooperi	Cricetidae		Eastern and Midwestern United States	
Southern broad-footed mole	Scapanus occultus	Scalopinae		California	
Southern flying squirrel	Glaucomys volans	Sciuridae		Eastern United States	
Southern mule deer	Odocoileus hemionus fuliginatus	Cervidae		Southern California	
Southern pocket gopher	Thomomys umbrinus	Geomyidae		Arizona, New Mexico	
Southern red-backed vole	Clethrionomys gapperi	Cricetidae		Alaska, Arizona, Colorado, Delaware, Idaho, Kentucky, Maryland, Michigan, Minnesota, Montana, New England, New Jersey, New Mexico, New York, North Carolina, North Dakota, Oregon, Pennsylvania, South Dakota, Tennessee, Utah, Virginia, Washington, West Virginia, Wisconsin and Wyoming	
Southern short-tailed shrew	Blarina carolinensis	Soricinae		Southern United States, Illinois	
Southern yellow bat	Lasiurus ega	Vespertilionidae		Lower Rio Grande Valley	
Southwestern myotis	Myotis auriculus	Vespertilionidae		Arizona, New Mexico	
Southwestern red squirrel	Tamiasciurus fremonti	Sciuridae		Western United States	
Sowerby's beaked whale	Mesoplodon bidens	Ziphiidae		New England	
Sperm whale	Physeter macrocephalus	Physeteridae		East and West Coast of the United States	The Connecticut state mammal
Spinner dolphin	Stenella longistrosis	Delphinidae		East Coast	
Spiny pocket mouse	Chaetodipus spinatus	Heteromyidae		Arizona, California and Nevada	
Spotted bat	Euderma maculatum	Vespertilionidae		Western United States	
Spotted seal	Phoca largha	Phocidae		Alaska	
Squirrel monkey	Saimiri sciureus	Cebidae		Florida, Puerto Rico	
Star-nosed mole	Condylura cristata	Scalopinae		Atlantic Coast, Great Lakes, New England	
Stejneger's beaked whale	Mesoplodon stejnegeri	Ziphiidae		West Coast of the United States	
Steller sea lion	Eumetopias jubatus	Otariidae		Alaska, West Coast	The largest eared seal
Stephen's kangaroo rat	Dipodomys stephensi	Heteromyidae		Southern California	
Stoat	Mustela erminea	Mustelidae		Alaska, the Dakotas, Great Lakes, New England, Northeastern United States, and the Western United States (excluding Arizona, Nevada, New Mexico and South California)	
Stone's caribou	Rangifer arcticus stone	Cervidae		Alaska	
Strecker's pocket gopher	Geomys streckeri	Geomyidae		Texas	
Striped dolphin	Stenella coeruleoalba	Delphinidae		East and West Coast of the United States	
Swamp rabbit	Sylvilagus aquaticus	Leporidae		Southern United States	
Swift fox	Vulpes velox	Canidae		Colorado, Kansas, Montana, New Mexico, Oklahoma and Texas	
Taiga vole	Microtus xanthognathus	Cricetidae		Alaska	
Texas antelope squirrel	Ammospermophilus interpres	Sciuridae		Texas, New Mexico	
Texas kangaroo rat	Dipodomys elator	Heteromyidae		Oklahoma, Texas	
Texas pocket gopher	Geomys personatus	Geomyidae		Texas	
Texas white-tailed deer	Odocoileus virginianus texanus	Cervidae		Colorado, Kansas, Nebraska, New Mexico, Oklahoma, Texas and Wyoming	The Nebraska state mammal and Oklahoma state game mammal
Thirteen-lined ground squirrel	Ictidomys tridecemlineatus	Sciuridae		Great Plains	
Townsend's big-eared bat	Corynorhinus townsendii	Vespertilionidae		Western United States	
Townsend's mole	Scapanus townsendii	Scalopinae		Coastal Pacific Northwest	The largest North American mole
Townsend's pocket gopher	Thomomys townsendii	Geomyidae		Northwestern United States	
Townsend's vole	Microtus townsendii	Cricetidae		Oregon and Washington	
Tricolored bat	Perimyotis subflavus	Vespertilionidae		Midwestern and Southern United States	
True's beaked whale	Mesoplodon mirus	Ziphiidae		East Coast	
Trowbridge's shrew	Sorex trowbridgii	Soricinae		Pacific Coast	
Tule elk	Cervus canadensis nannodes	Cervidae		California	
Tundra shrew	Sorex tundrensis	Soricinae		Alaska	
Unalaska collared lemming	Dicrostonyx unalascensis	Cricetidae		Umnak and Unalaska	
Underwood's bonneted bat	Eumops underwoodi	Molossidae		Arizona	
Utah prairie dog	Cynomys parvidens	Sciuridae		Utah	
Vagrant shrew	Sorex vagrans	Soricinae		Western United States	
Velvety free-tailed bat	Molossus molossus	Molossidae		Florida Keys, Puerto Rico	
Virginia big-eared bat	Corynorhinus townsendii virginianus	Vespertilionidae		Kentucky, North Carolina, Virginia and West Virginia	The Virginia state bat
Virginia opossum	Didelphis virginiana	Didelphidae		Eastern United States, Lower Midwest, Pacific Coast (introduced), Southern United States	The only marsupial that inhabits the United States; The North Carolina state marsupial
Virginia white-tailed deer	Odocoileus virginianus virginianus	Cervidae		Southeastern United States except Florida	The Georgia, Mississippi and South Carolina state mammal
Walrus	Odobenus rosmarus	Odobenidae		Alaska	
Wasatch Mountains red fox	Vulpes vulpen macroura	Canidae		Colorado, Idaho, Montana, Utah, Wyoming	
Western gray squirrel	Sciurus griseus	Sciuridae		Western United States	
Western heather vole	Phenacomys intermedius	Cricetidae		Western United States	
Western mastiff bat	Eumops perotis	Molossidae		Southwestern United States	
Western meadow vole	Microtus drummondii	Cricetidae		Midwestern and Western United States	
Western red-backed vole	Clethrionomys californicus	Cricetidae		California and Oregon	
Western red bat	Lasiurus frantzii	Vespertilionidae		Western United States	
Western small-footed myotis	Myotis ciliolabrum	Vespertilionidae		Great Plains, Western United States	
Western yellow bat	Lasiurus xanthinus	Vespertilionidae		Southwestern United States	
White-beaked dolphin	Lagenorhynchus albirostris	Delphinidae		New England	
White-eared pocket mouse	Perognathus alticola	Heteromyidae		Southern California	
White-footed vole	Arborimus albipes	Cricetidae		Northwestern United States	
White-sided jackrabbit	Lepus callotis	Leporidae		New Mexico	
White-tailed antelope squirrel	Ammospermophilus leucurus	Sciuridae		Southwestern United States	
White-tailed deer	Odocoileus virginianus	Cervidae		Contiguous United States	
White-tailed jackrabbit	Lepus townsendii	Leporidae		Upper Midwest and Western United States	
White-tailed prairie dog	Cynomys leucurus	Sciuridae		Utah, Colorado, Wyoming and Montana	
Wolf	Canis lupus	Canidae		Across the country except Hawaii, Puerto Rico and the U.S. Virgin Islands	
Wolverine	Gulo gulo	Mustelidae		Alaska; has been in various states of the West	The largest mustelid
Woodland vole	Microtus pinetorum	Cricetidae		Eastern United States	
Wyoming pocket gopher	Thomomys clusius	Geomyidae		Wyoming	
Yellow-bellied marmot	Marmota flaviventris	Sciuridae		Western United States	
Yellow-faced pocket gopher	Cratogeomys castanops	Geomyidae		Southwestern United States	
Yuma myotis	Myotis yumanensis	Vespertilionidae		Western United States	

== Articles by area ==
- Fauna of Alabama
- Fauna of Alaska
- Fauna of Arizona
- Fauna of Arkansas
- Fauna of California
- Fauna of Colorado
- Fauna of Connecticut
- Fauna of Delaware
- Fauna of the District of Columbia
- Fauna of Florida
- Fauna of Georgia
- Fauna of Hawaii
- Fauna of Idaho
- Fauna of Illinois
- Fauna of Indiana
- Fauna of Iowa
- Fauna of Kansas
- Fauna of Kentucky
- Fauna of Louisiana
- Fauna of Maine
- Fauna of Maryland
- Fauna of Massachusetts
- Fauna of Michigan
- Fauna of Minnesota
- Fauna of Mississippi
- Fauna of Missouri
- Fauna of Montana
- Fauna of Nebraska
- Fauna of Nevada
- Fauna of New Hampshire
- Fauna of New Jersey
- Fauna of New Mexico
- Fauna of New York
- Fauna of North Carolina
- Fauna of North Dakota
- Fauna of Ohio
- Fauna of Oklahoma
- Fauna of Oregon
- Fauna of Pennsylvania
- Fauna of Rhode Island
- Fauna of South Carolina
- Fauna of South Dakota
- Fauna of Tennessee
- Fauna of Texas
- Fauna of Utah
- Fauna of Vermont
- Fauna of Virginia
- Fauna of Washington
- Fauna of West Virginia
- Fauna of Wisconsin
- Fauna of Wyoming

=== Insular areas ===
- Fauna of American Samoa
- Fauna of Guam
- Fauna of the Northern Mariana Islands
- Fauna of Puerto Rico
- Fauna of the United States Virgin Islands

== See also ==
- Animal welfare in the United States
- Flora of the United States
- Invasive species in the United States
