= List of mammals of Maryland =

This is a list of mammals of Maryland, those mammals native to or immediately off the coast of the U.S. state of Maryland.

Maryland does not have a designated state mammal, but does designate the calico cat as its state cat, the Chesapeake Bay Retriever as its state dog, and the Thoroughbred as its state horse. Seven species of mammals in Maryland have been extirpated: the eastern wolf, elk, American bison, cougar, snowshoe hare, American marten and eastern harvest mouse. Additionally, some have been introduced. The coypu, an invasive species, has since been extirpated through culling efforts.

== Didelphimorphia ==
Image	Scientific name	Common name	Family	Conservation status
	Didelphis virginiana	Virginia opossum opossum North American opossum	Didelphidae	least concern

== Chiroptera ==
Image	Scientific name	Common name	Family	Conservation status
	Myotis lucifugus	little brown bat	Verspertillionidae	endangered
	Myotis sodalis	Indiana bat	Verspertillionidae	near threatened
	Myotis leeibi	eastern small-footed bat	Verspertillionidae	endangered
	Myotis septentrionalis	northern long-eared bat	Verspertillionidae	near threatened
	Lasionycteris noctivagans	silver-haired bat	Verspertillionidae	least concern
	Perimyotis subflavus	tricolored bat	Verspertillionidae	vulnerable
	Eptesicus fuscus	big brown bat	Verspertillionidae	least concern
	Lasiurus borealis	red bat	Verspertillionidae	least concern
	Lasiurus cinereus	hoary bat	Verspertillionidae	least concern
	Nycticeius humeralis	evening bat	Verspertillionidae	least concern

== Eulipotyphla ==
Image	Scientific name	Common name	Family	Conservation status
	Sorex cinereus	cinereus shrew	Soricidae	least concern
	Sorex longirostris	southeastern shrew	Soricidae	least concern
	Sorex palustris	American water shrew northern water shrew	Soricidae	least concern
	Sorex fumeus	smoky shrew	Soricidae	least concern
	Sorex dispar	long-tailed shrew	Soricidae	least concern
	Sorex hoyi	American pygmy shrew	Soricidae	least concern
	Blarina brevicauda	northern short-tailed shrew	Soricidae	least concern
	Cryptotis parva	least shrew	Soricidae	least concern
	Parascalops breweri	hairy-tailed mole	Talpidae	least concern
	Scalopus aquaticus	eastern mole	Talpidae	least concern
	Condylura cristata	star-nosed mole	Talpidae	least concern

== Lagomorpha ==
Image	Scientific name	Common name	Family	Conservation status
	Sylvilagus floridanus	eastern cottontail	Leporidae	least concern
	Sylvilagus obscurus	Appalachian cottontail	Leporidae	near threatened
	Lepus americanus	snowshoe hare	Leporidae	possibly extirpated
	Lepus californicus	black-tailed jackrabbit	Leporidae	introduced

== Rodentia ==
Image	Scientific name	Common name	Family	Conservation status
	Tamias striatus	eastern chipmunk	Sciuridae	least concern
	Marmota monax	groundhog woodchuck marmot	Sciuridae	least concern
	Sciurus carolinensis	eastern gray squirrel	Sciuridae	least concern
	Sciurus niger cinereus	eastern fox squirrel Delmarva fox squirrel	Sciuridae	least concern
	Tamiasciurus hudsonicus	red squirrel	Sciuridae	least concern
	Glaucomys volans	southern flying squirrel	Sciuridae	least concern
	Castor canadensis	American beaver	Castoridae	least concern
	Oryzomys palustris	marsh rice rat	Sigmodontidae	least concern
	Reithrodontomys humulis	eastern harvest mouse	Sigmodontidae	extirpated
	Peromyscus maniculatus	eastern deer mouse	Sigmodontidae	least concern
	Peromyscus leucopus	white-footed deer mouse	Sigmodontidae	least concern
	Neotoma magister	Allegheny woodrat	Sigmodontidae	least concern
	Zapus hudsonius	meadow jumping mouse	Dipodidae	least concern
	Napaeozapus insignis	woodland jumping mouse	Dipodidae	least concern
	Rattus rattus	black rat roof rat ship rat house rat	Murinae	least concern (introduced)
	Rattus norvegicus	Norway rat brown rat sewer rat wharf rat street rat	Murinae	least concern (introduced)
	Mus musculus	house mouse	Murinae	least concern (introduced)
	Clethrionomys gapperi	southern red-backed vole Gapper's red-backed vole	Cricetidae	least concern
	Microtus pennsylvanicus	meadow vole	Cricetidae	least concern
	Microtus chrotorrhinus	rock vole	Cricetidae	least concern
	Microtus pinetorum	woodland vole	Cricetidae	least concern
	Ondatra zibethicus	muskrat	Cricetidae	least concern
	Synaptomys cooperi	southern bog lemming	Cricetidae	least concern
	Erethizon dorsatum	North American porcupine	Erethizontidae	least concern
	Myocastor coypus	coypu nutria	Echimyidae	least concern (introduced), extirpated

== Cetacea ==
Image	Scientific name	Common name	Family	Conservation status
	Kogia breviceps	pygmy sperm whale	Kogiidae	least concern
	Kogia simus	dwarf sperm whale	Kogiidae	least concern
	Physeter macrocephalus	sperm whale cachalot	Physeteridae	vulnerable
	Ziphius cavirostris	Cuvier's beaked whale	Ziphidae	least concern
	Mesoplodon mirus	True's beaked whale	Ziphidae	least concern
	Delphinus delphis	short-beaked common dolphin	Delphinidae	least concern
	Tursiops truncatus	common bottlenose dolphin	Delphinidae	least concern
	Stenella frontalis	Atlantic spotted dolphin	Delphinidae	least concern
	Stenella coeruleoalba	striped dolphin	Delphinidae	least concern
	Leucopleurus acutus	Atlantic white-sided dolphin	Delphinidae	least concern
	Grampus griseus	Risso's dolphin	Delphinidae	least concern
	Orcinus orca	killer whale orca	Delphinidae	least concern
	Globicephala melas	long-finned pilot whale	Delphinidae	least concern
	Globicephala macrorhynchus	short-finned pilot whale	Delphinidae	least concern
	Peponocephala electra	melon-headed whale	Delphinidae	least concern
	Phocoena phocoena	harbour porpoise	Phocoenidae	least concern
	Balaenoptera musculus	blue whale	Balaenopteridae	endangered
	Balaenoptera physalus	fin whale	Balaenopteridae	vulnerable
	Balaenoptera borealis	sei whale	Balaenopteridae	endangered
	Balaenoptera acutorostrata	common minke whale	Balaenopteridae	least concern
	Megaptera novaeangliae	humpback whale	Balaenopteridae	least concern
	Eubalaena glacialis	north Atlantic right whale	Balaenidae	critically endangered

== Sirenia ==
Image	Scientific name	Common name	Family	Conservation status
	Trichechus manatus	West Indian manatee	Trichechidae	least concern, vagrant

== Carnivora ==
Image	Scientific name	Common name	Family	Conservation status
	Canis latrans	coyote	Canidae	least concern
	Canis rufus	red wolf	Canidae	extirpated
	Urocyon cinereoargenteus	gray fox	Canidae	least concern
	Vulpes vulpes	red fox	Canidae	least concern
	Ursus americanus	black bear	Ursidae	least concern
	Procyon lotor	raccoon	Procyonidae	least concern
	Mephitis mephitis	striped skunk	Mephitidae	least concern
	Spilogale putorius	eastern spotted skunk	Mephitidae	vulnerable
	Lontra canadensis	American river otter	Mustelidae	least concern
	Martes americana	American marten	Mustelidae	extirpated
	Mustela nivalis	least weasel	Mustelidae	least concern
	Mustela richardsonii	American ermine	Mustelidae	not evaluated
	Neogale frenata	long-tailed weasel	Mustelidae	least concern
	Neogale vison	American mink	Mustelidae	least concern
	Pekania pennanti	fisher	Mustelidae	least concern
	Cystophora cristata	hooded seal	Phocidae	vulnerable
	Halichoerus grypus	grey seal	Phocidae	least concern
	Pagophilus groenlandicus	harp seal	Phocidae	least concern
	Phoca vitulina	harbor seal	Phocidae	least concern
	Lynx rufus	bobcat	Felidae	least concern
	Puma concolor	mountain lion puma cougar	Felidae	extirpated

== Artiodactyla ==
Image	Scientific name	Common name	Family	Conservation status
	Bison bison	American bison	Bovidae	extirpated
	Cervus canadensis	elk	Cervidae	extirpated
	Cervus nippon	sika deer	Cervidae	least concern, introduced
	Odocoileus virginianus	white-tailed deer	Cervidae	least concern
