= Pygmy shrew =

Pygmy shrew may refer to one of various species of shrews:

- American pygmy shrew, Sorex hoyi
- Eurasian pygmy shrew, Sorex minutus
- Etruscan shrew, Suncus etruscus
