= Swamp snake =

There are two genera of snake named swamp snake:

- Liodytes, a monotypic genus with its sole representative, the black swamp snake, Liodytes pygaea
- Limnophis
