= Hilton Head white-tailed deer =

Scientific classification
- Kingdom: Animalia
- Phylum: Chordata
- Class: Mammalia
- Order: Artiodactyla
- Family: Cervidae
- Subfamily: Capreolinae
- Genus: Odocoileus
- Species: O. virginianus
- Subspecies: O. v. hiltonensis

Trinomial name
- Odocoileus virginianus hiltonensis (Goldman and Kellogg, 1940)

Subspecies of deer

Hilton Head white-tailed deer (Odocoileus virginianus hiltonensis) are a subspecies of white-tailed deer indigenous to Hilton Head Island in South Carolina. The deer live in a mainly suburban environment and have developed (according to a study) home range areas on the island.

Hilton Head white-tailed deer are listed as a "species of concern" by the United States Fish and Wildlife Service although culling of the deer is regularly approved in order to reduce the population and prevent accidents. The culls caused controversy amongst area residents and wildlife groups. Before culling was approved many of the deer were relocated across the island to spread out the herd. Sea Pines Plantation, a mixed residential and natural area, became a site of controversy when residents complained about the deer eating their shrubbery, and causing property damage. A University of Georgia professor formulated a plan to cut the subspecies population in half, which was met with a lawsuit against the university by local wildlife groups seeking to stop the program. The professor stated that the animals lack a natural predator on the island. On August 27, 1998, an injunction by a local judge temporarily blocked any killing of the population. The South Carolina Legislature designated Sea Pines a state wildlife sanctuary in 1971, but a circuit judge agreed that culling of the deer population was legal in 1999. The South Carolina Supreme Court concurred with the ruling and allowed the culling to proceed so long as it was regulated by the state. Subsequently, there has been little opposition to the population reduction program, and after only three years the size of the herd had been reduced by 500. Deer-vehicle collisions were also reduced from 60 per year to 10 per year.
