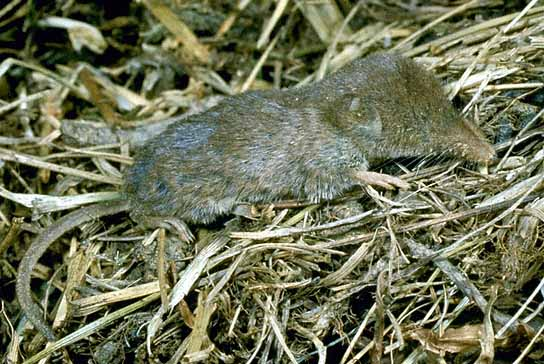
- A dismal swamp southeastern shrew, Sorex longirostris fisheri

Conservation status
- Least Concern (IUCN 3.1)

Scientific classification
- Kingdom: Animalia
- Phylum: Chordata
- Class: Mammalia
- Order: Eulipotyphla
- Family: Soricidae
- Genus: Sorex
- Species: S. longirostris

Binomial name
- Sorex longirostris Bachman, 1837
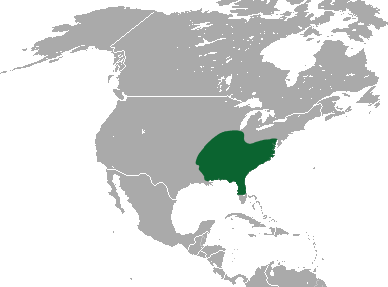
- Southeastern shrew range

= Southeastern shrew =

Species of mammal

The southeastern shrew (Sorex longirostris) is a species of mammal in the family Soricidae. It is found in the southeastern United States.

== Description ==
The southeastern shrew (Sorex longirostris) is reddish-brown above on its back, head area while the shrew is grayish below in the abdomen area. The shrew's long tail is vaguely bi-colored, with dark and light brown as the color. The southeastern shrew is slightly smaller and more reddish than the masked shrew, which looks very similar to the southeastern shrew. Shrews possess lengthy pointed snouts, tiny eyes and ears. Their hearing and smell are very acute. The tips of the incisor teeth are dark chestnut in color. The pigmentation on the tip of their teeth is caused by deposition of iron in the outer pigmented teeth. It weighs in at 0.11-0.14 ounces and has an approximate total length of 2-4 inches. Their lifespan in the wild is rarely more than a year, but they can live as long as 18 or 19 months.

== Subspecies ==
There are three subspecies of the southeastern shrew, distinguished by their varying sizes:

- The dismal swamp southeastern shrew (S. l. fisheri), in southeastern Virginia and eastern North Carolina, including the Great Dismal Swamp.
- S. l. eionis, in northern Florida
- S. l. longirostris, occurs in the rest of the range, including Maryland, Louisiana, Oklahoma, Missouri, Indiana, southern Ohio, and central Illinois.

== Breeding ==
The breeding season takes place from March–October and 1 to 2 litters is produced with 1-6 young per litter. The nests are composed of leafy material and fine grasses and are often found in rotting logs.

== Behavior ==
The southeastern shrew is active during the day and night, usually hunting for insects to eat. They make a chipping noise that can be heard occasionally. Southeastern shrews are active, spending most of their time in the burrows of other animals and rooting beneath the leaf litter feeding on the forest floor.

== Distribution ==
The habitat for the southeastern shrews include forests and woodlands, scrub, shrub and brushlands, meadows and fields, swamps, marshes, and bogs. Their habitat ranges from fields to forests, but southeastern shrews prefer areas in early stages of succession and disturbed areas such as cultivated and abandoned fields with dense ground cover of Lonicera spp. (honeysuckles), grasses, and herbs. Southeastern shrews are active both day and night, spending most of their time in the burrows of other animals and rooting beneath the leaf litter on the forest floor. The shrews have a population density of 12 individuals per acre.

== Diet ==
The southeastern shrew has a diet consisting primarily of spiders, as well as the larvae of butterflies, moths, slugs, and beetles; the species is also known to consume plants and centipedes.

== Predation ==
Known predators of the southeastern shrew are opossums; owls, including barn and barred owls; snakes; hooded mergansers; domestic cats (see cat predation on wildlife); and domestic dogs.
