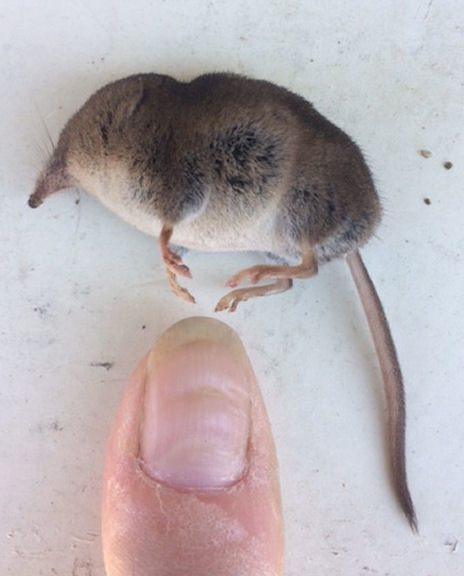

Conservation status
- Least Concern (IUCN 3.1)

Scientific classification
- Kingdom: Animalia
- Phylum: Chordata
- Class: Mammalia
- Order: Eulipotyphla
- Family: Soricidae
- Genus: Sorex
- Species: S. dispar

Binomial name
- Sorex dispar Batchelder, 1911
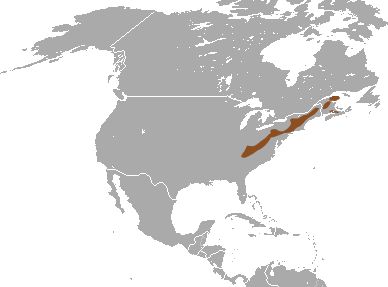
- Long-tailed shrew range

Synonyms
- Sorex gaspensis (Anthony & Goodwin, 1924)

= Long-tailed shrew =

Species of mammal

The long-tailed shrew or rock shrew (Sorex dispar) is a small shrew found in Atlantic Canada and the Northeastern United States.

This shrew is slate grey in color with a pointed snout, a long tail, and lighter underparts. It is found on rocky slopes in mountainous areas along the Atlantic coast from Gaspé Peninsula, Quebec, and Cape Breton Island, Nova Scotia, to northern Georgia. It eats insects and spiders. Predators include hawks, owls, and snakes.

== Physical features ==
The long-tailed shrew is small, slender, black to slate-gray in color, and with a long tail. Its average length, including tail length, is 120 mm (4.7 in). The head and body length can be 48 to 79 mm (1.9 to 3.1 in). The tail length, which averages from 80 to 90% of head-body length, ranges from 46 to 67 mm (1.8 to 2.6 in). The long-tailed shrew has a hind foot length of 12–15 mm (0.47–0.59 in), and can have a total body weight of 3.1 to 8.3 g (0.11 to 0.29 oz). The tail is furry with hair that is faintly bicolored. In older long-tailed shrews, a loss of hair from the tail may be exhibited. The long-tailed shrew has a long, slender muzzle with long whiskers that range from 22 to 23 mm (0.87 to 0.91 in) long. In the summer, the pelage color of the long-tailed shrew is slate gray with the ventral side of the body lighter than the dorsum.

== Range ==
The long-tailed shrew has an unusually limited geographic range. The species can be found in the Appalachian Mountains, Nova Scotia, and Southeastern New Brunswick, from Canada southward along the mountains to North Carolina, and small ranges of the species in Tennessee. In New York, the long-tailed shrew is found in the Adirondacks and Catskills. It is only found in a small area in Pennsylvania. In Massachusetts, the long-tailed shrew is only found in Berkshire County.

== Habitat ==
The long-tailed shrew generally inhabits two types of environments: near mountain streams, or under and among rocks. The species can be found in mountainous, forested areas that could be deciduous or evergreen, and in rocky, damp areas where deep crevices are abundant that can be covered by leaf mold and roots. In numerous descriptions of the species habitat, rocks are an important component of the habitat, giving the species the name rock shrew.

== Behavior ==
The long-tailed shrew uses its long tail for balance when it is climbing among the rocks or boulders. It spends most of its time underground or between the numerous crevices found in its environment. It is active all year-round

== Diet ==
The long-tailed shrew has an extremely narrow skull, as well as large incisors which give it the ability to extract insects, spiders, worms and centipedes from the rocky crevices of its environment.

== Reproduction ==
Reproduction in the long-tailed shrew occurs in spring and summer; the breeding time ranges possibly late April to August. The long-tailed shrew produces one or two litters from May through August, with two to five young per litter. As a result of its short lifespan, sexual maturity is reached in less than a year.

== Conservation ==
Overall, no major threats of the long-tailed shrew exist throughout its range. However, the species has ingested pesticides from the invertebrates it consumes. Most long-tailed shrews reside in public lands, national forests, parks, or remote lands. To help conserve them, mass disturbance of habitat land is to be prevented, as well as much protection from pesticide contamination as possible.

== Similar species ==
The northernmost examples of this species were until recently thought to be a separate species, the Gaspé shrew (S. gaspensis) inhabiting the Gaspé Peninsula and Cape Breton Island. However, a 2004 study indicated that the two species were conspecific, with the long-tailed shrew exhibiting a cline towards a smaller size at the northern edge of its range. When they were regarded as separate species, the Gaspé and long-tailed shrews inhabited similar habitats, but were thought to be sympatric species with adjacent ranges. They are now generally accepted to be the same species, with S. gaspensis a junior synonym, not a subspecies.
