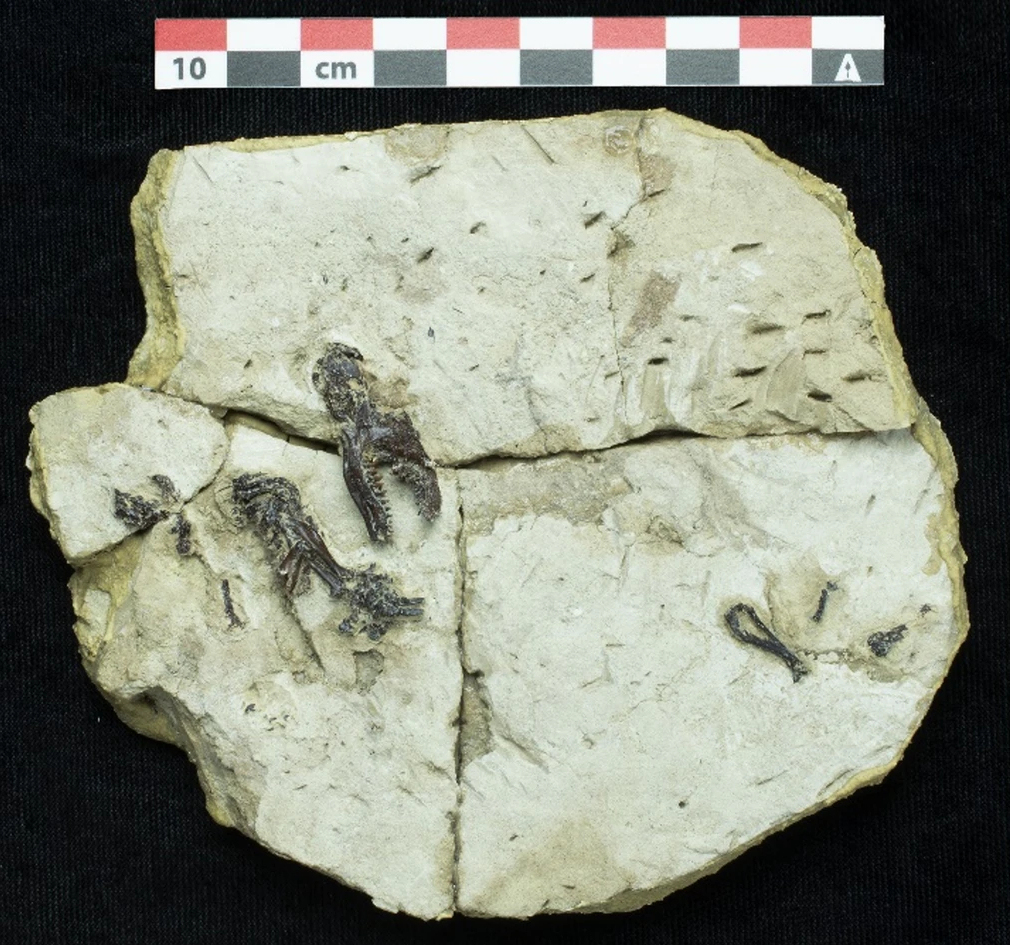
- Holotype block

Scientific classification
- Kingdom: Animalia
- Phylum: Chordata
- Class: Mammalia
- Order: Eulipotyphla
- Family: Talpidae
- Tribe: Scalopini
- Subtribe: Scalopina
- Genus: †Vulcanoscaptor; Linares-Martín, 2025
- Species: †V. ninoti

Binomial name
- †Vulcanoscaptor ninoti Linares-Martín, 2025

= Vulcanoscaptor =

Vulcanoscaptor Temporal range: Lower Pliocene

Extinct genus of moles

Vulcanoscaptor is an extinct genus of moles belonging to the family Talpidae. It is closely related to the modern genus Scalopus (eastern mole) within the tribe Scalopini. Vulcanoscaptor is known from the early Pliocene Camp dels Ninots Konservat-Lagerstätten site of Spain. The genus contains a single species, Vulcanoscaptor ninoti, described in 2025. The holotype specimen, comprising a skull and mandible with associated limb bones, vertebrae, and pectoral girdle elements, is the most complete talpid from the Pliocene of Europe, as most specimens are isolated teeth and other fragmentary elements.

== Discovery and naming ==
In 1985, the first bone was found in the Camp dels Ninots fossil site in the town of Caldes de Malavella, in the Province of Girona, Spain. The specimen was referred to the extinct bovine Leptobos. Starting in 2003, the Institut Català de Paleoecologia Humana i Evolució Socia began systematic excavations and research in the locality, yielding skeletons of various mammals, amphibians, fish, invertebrates, and plants. Among the specimens collected since then was the partial skull and skeleton of a small mole, comprising a skull and mandible with associated forelimb and hindlimb bones, poorly preserved ribs, vertebrae, and pectoral girdle elements. Preliminary observations identified the specimen, catalogued as CN10-O17-NIV11-12, as belonging to Talpa minor based on the size and discovery location.

In 2025, Linares-Martín and colleagues described Vulcanoscaptor ninoti as a new genus and species of talpid moles, establishing these fossil remains as the holotype specimen. The generic name, Vulcanoscaptor, combines a reference to Vulcan, the Roman god of fire, alluding to the volocanic nature of the type locality, with the ancient Greek word scaptein, meaning "to dig". The specific name, ninoti, is derived from the Catalan word ninot ("doll"), which refers to the shape of the opaline nodules found in the type locality.

Vulcanoscaptor is the fifth talpid mole named from the Pliocene of Spain, following Archaeodesmana, Desmana, Galemys, and Desmanella.

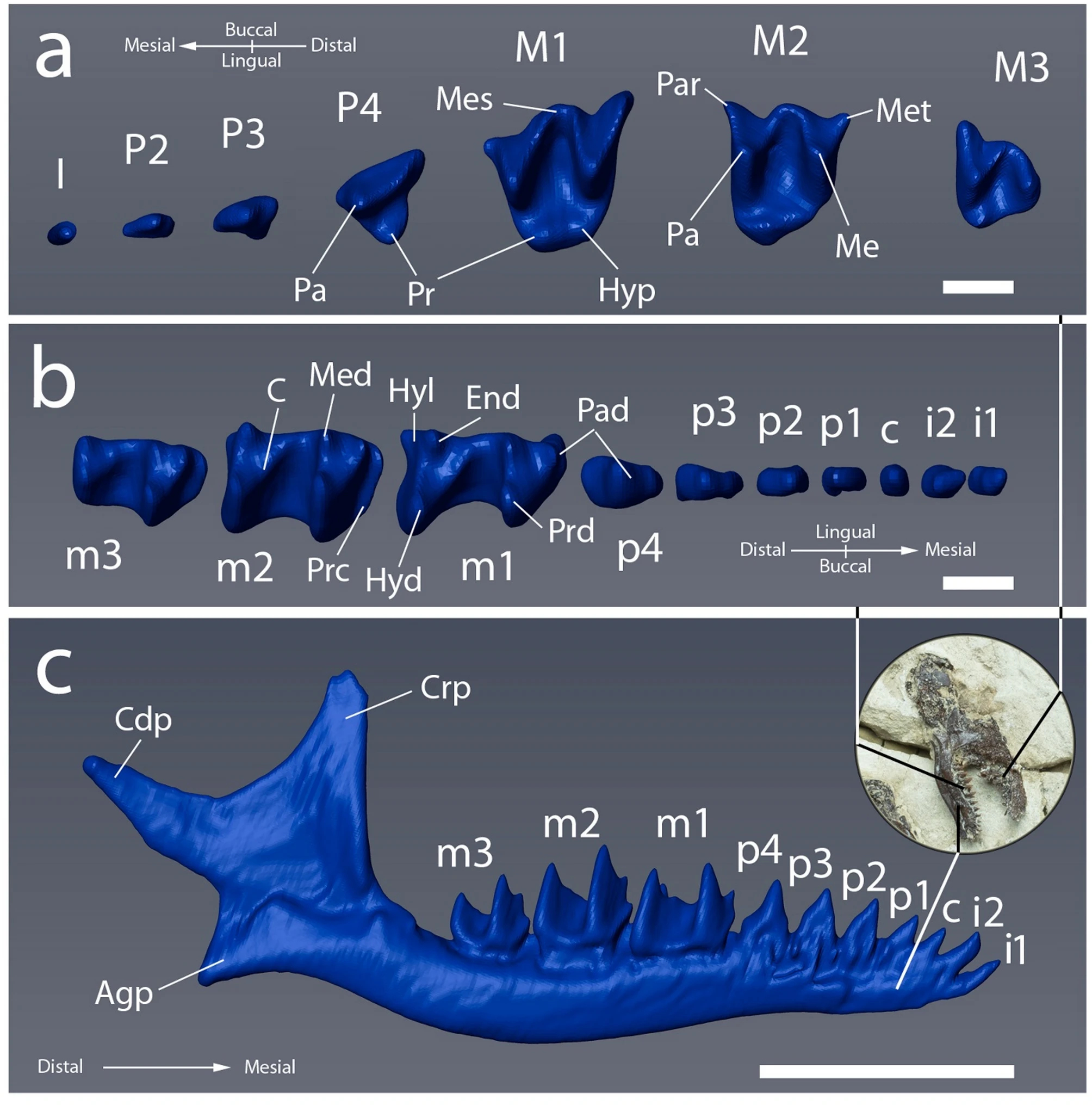
Holotype teeth and mandible

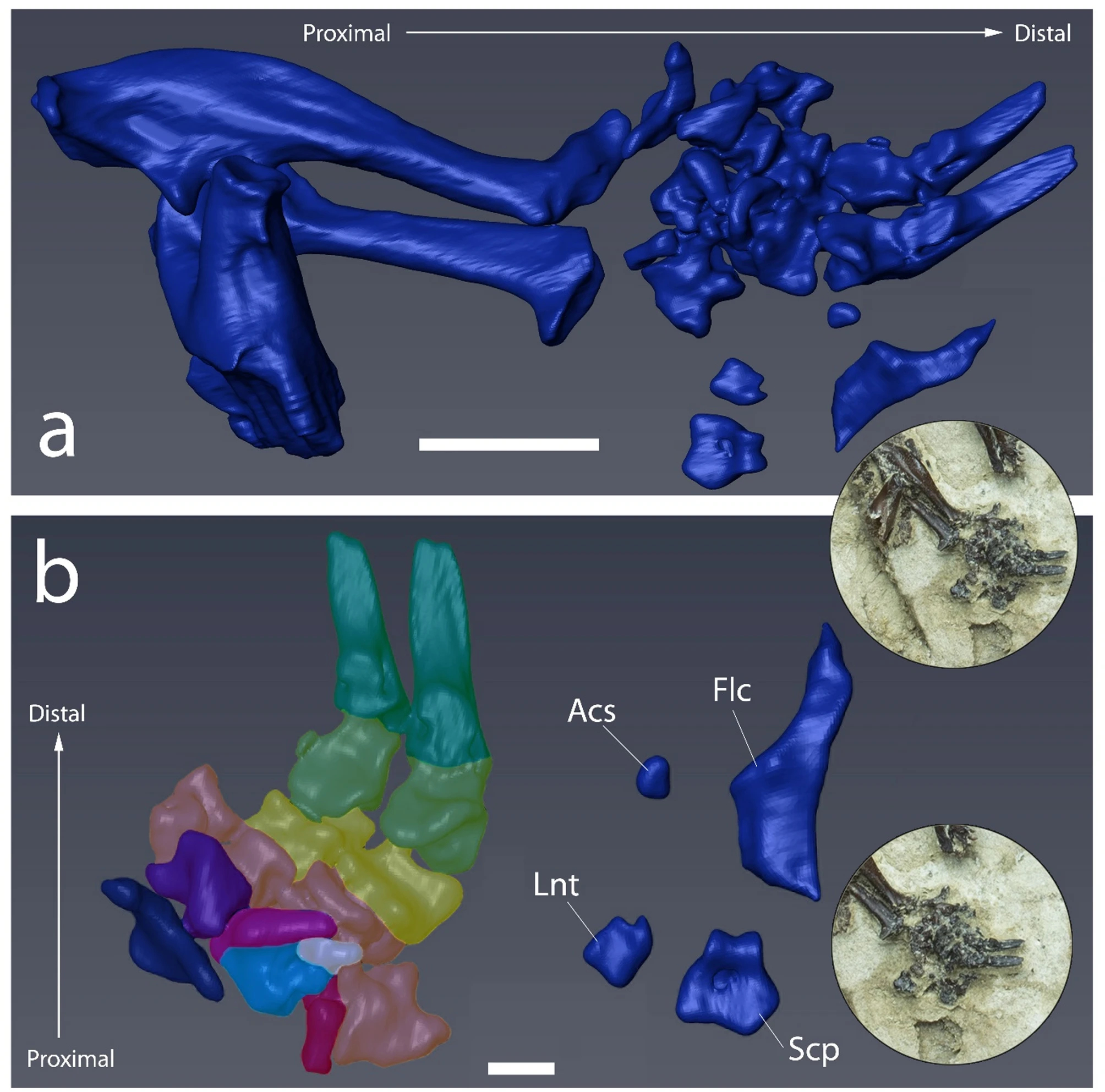
Reconstruction of the holotype forelimb

== Classification ==
In their phylogenetic analysis including 41 extant and extinct species, Linares-Martín et al. (2025) recovered Vulcanoscaptor as a derived member of the mole family Talpidae, which includes the 'true moles' and their relatives (Talpinae), shrew moles (Uropsilinae) and desmans (Desmaninae). Their analysis, which used morphological characters rather than genetic data, recovered the clades traditionally recognized by mammal researchers, with some recovered as paraphyletic lineages. More precisely, Vulcanoscaptor was placed as a member of the tribe Scalopini within the subfamily Talpinae. As the sister taxon to the modern mole species Scalopus aquaticus (the eastern/common mole), it can be classified as a member of the subtribe Scalopina. An abbreviated form of their results is displayed in the cladogram below:

- Talpidae
  - †Eotalpa
  - - Uropsilinae
      Uropsilus (shrew moles)
    - - †Myxomygale
      - - Desmaninae (desmans)
        - Talpinae
          - Urotrichini (Japanese shrew moles)
          - - †Tegulariscaptor
            - - - Scaptonychini
                  Scaptonyx fusicauda (long-tailed mole)
                - †Geotrypus
              - - - †Mongoloscapter
                  - Neurotrichini
                    Neurotrichus
                - - Condylurini
                    Condylura cristata (star-nosed mole)
                  - - Talpini (Old World moles)
                    - Scalopini
                      - †Proscapanus
                      - - Parascalopina
                          ⊞
                          - †Dominoides
                          - - Parascalops breweri (hairy-tailed mole)
                            - - Scapanulus oweni (Gansu mole)
                              - - †Scapanoscapter
                                - - - †Yanshuella
                                    - †Yunoscaptor
                                  - - †Leptoscaptor
                                    - †Mioscalops spp.
                          ⊟
                        - Scalopina
                          - - Alpiscaptulus medogensis (Medog mole)
                            - †Hugueneya
                          - - Scapanus
                            - - Scalopus aquaticus (eastern/common mole)
                              - †Vulcanoscaptor
