= List of mammals of New York =

This is a full list of the mammals native to the U.S. state of New York.

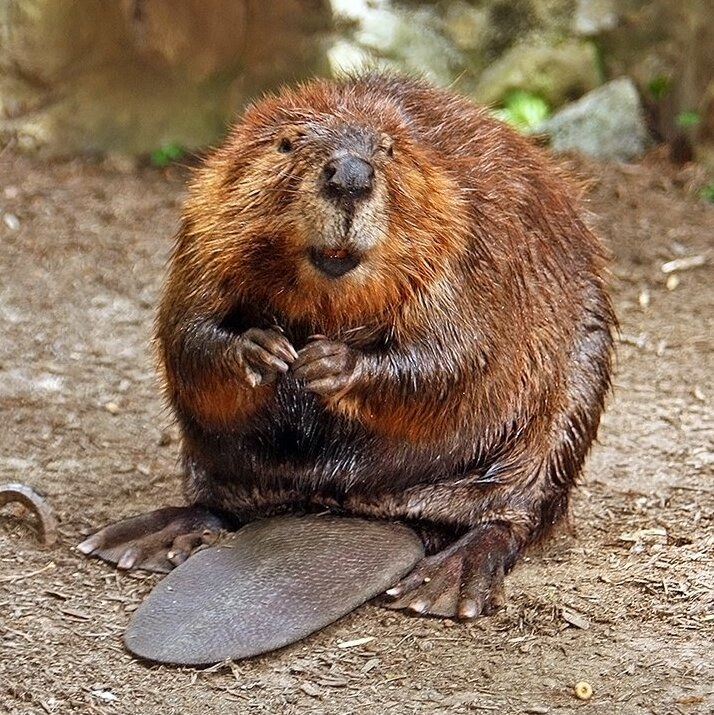
The North American beaver is the state mammal of New York.

The following tags are used to highlight each species' conservation status as assessed by the International Union for Conservation of Nature:

EX	Extinct	No reasonable doubt that the last individual has died.
EW	Extinct in the wild	The species is known to survive only in captivity or as a naturalized population well outside its previous range.
CR	Critically endangered	The species is in imminent risk of extinction in the wild.
EN	Endangered	The species is facing an extremely high risk of extinction in the wild.
VU	Vulnerable	The species is facing a high risk of extinction in the wild.
NT	Near threatened	The species does not meet any of the criteria that would categorize it as risking extinction but it is likely to do so in the future.
LC	Least concern	There are no current identifiable risks to the species.
DD	Data deficient	There is inadequate information to make an assessment of the risks to this species.

== Opossums, order Didelphimorphia ==
Didelphimorphia is the order of common opossums of the Western Hemisphere. Opossums probably diverged from the basic South American marsupials in the late Cretaceous or early Paleocene. The Virginia opossum is the only marsupial/opossum species in New York.

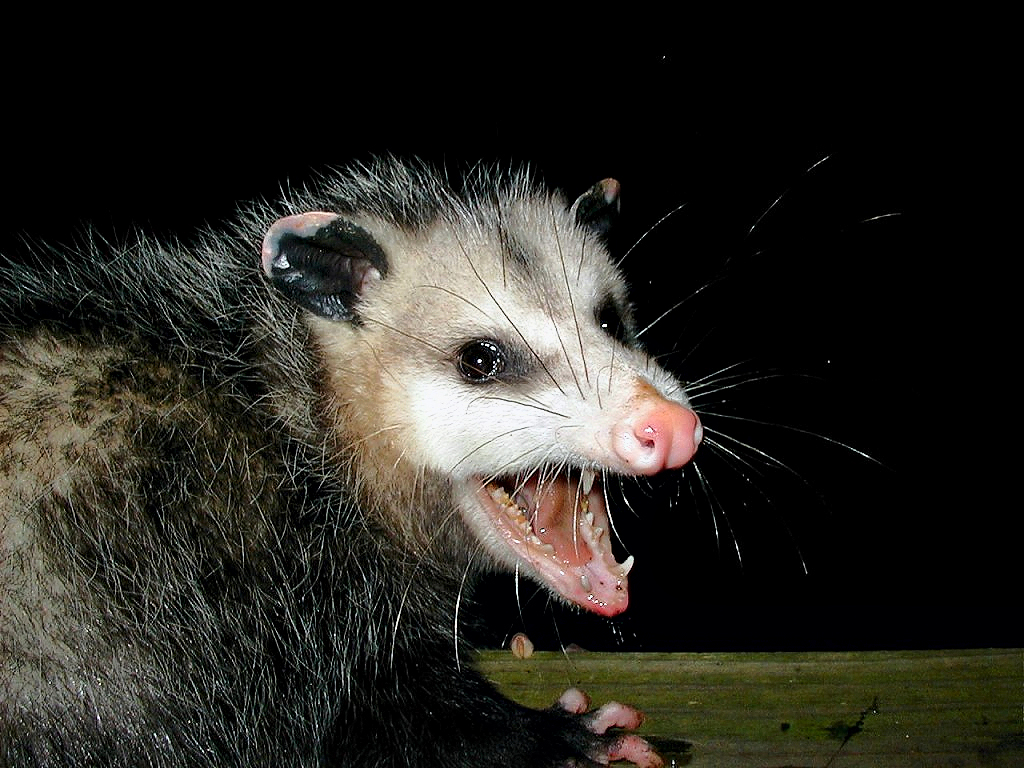
Virginia opossum

- Family Didelphidae (American opossums)
  - Subfamily: Didelphinae
    - Genus: Didelphis
      - Virginia opossum, D. virginiana LC

== Insectivores, order Eulipotyphla ==
Eulipotyphlans are insectivorous mammals. Shrews closely resemble mice, while moles are stout-bodied burrowers.

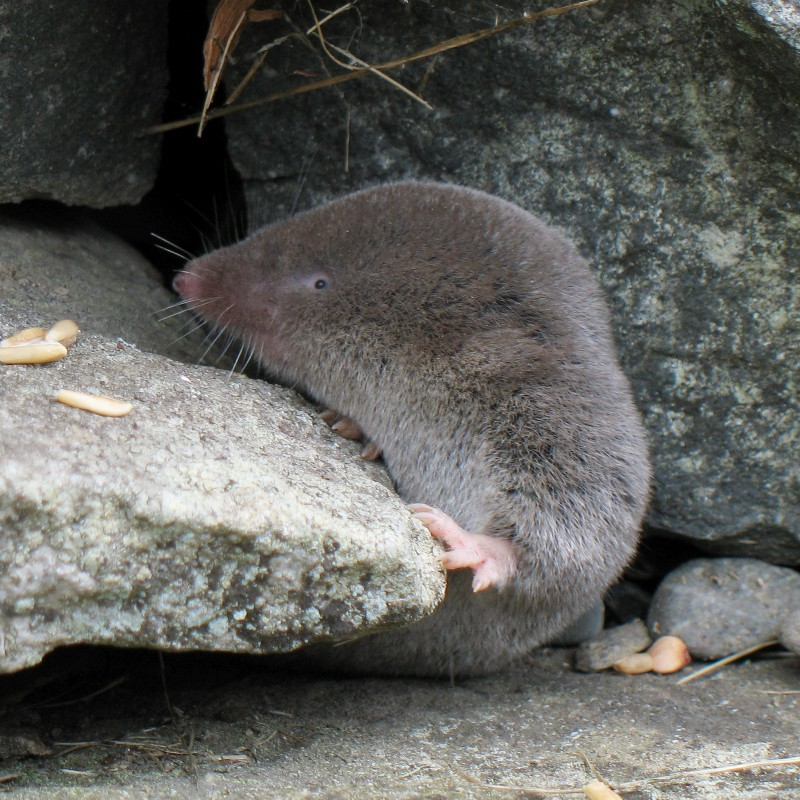
Northern short-tailed shrew

- Family Soricidae (shrews)
  - Genus: Blarina
    - Northern short-tailed shrew, B. brevicauda LC
  - Genus: Cryptotis
    - North American least shrew, C. parva LC
  - Genus: Sorex
    - Masked shrew, S. cinereus LC
    - Long-tailed shrew, S. dispar LC
    - Smoky shrew, S. fumeus LC
    - American pygmy shrew, S. hoyi LC
    - American water shrew, S. palustris LC

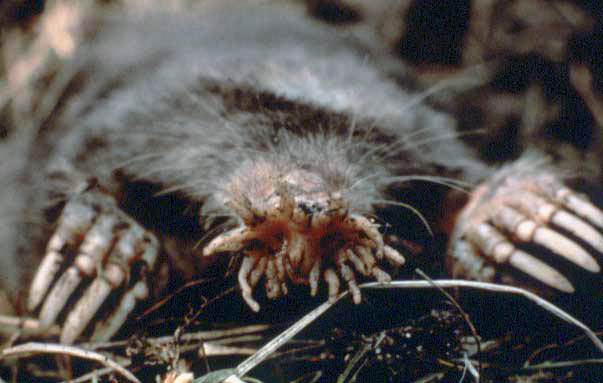
Star-nosed mole

- Family Talpidae (moles)
  - Genus: Condylura
    - Star-nosed mole, C. cristata LC
  - Genus: Parascalops
    - Hairy-tailed mole, P. breweri LC
  - Genus: Scalopus
    - Eastern mole, S. aquaticus LC

== Lagomorphs, order Lagomorpha ==
Though lagomorphs can resemble rodents, and were classified as a superfamily in that order until the early 20th century, they have since been considered a separate order. They differ from rodents in a number of physical characteristics, such as having four incisors in the upper jaw rather than two.

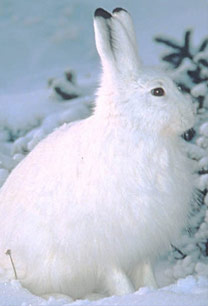
Snowshoe hare

- Family Leporidae (rabbits and hares)
  - Genus: Lepus
    - Snowshoe hare, L. americanus LC
    - European hare, L. europaeus LC introduced
  - Genus: Sylvilagus
    - Eastern cottontail, S. floridanus LC
    - New England cottontail, S. transitionalis VU

== Rodents, order Rodentia ==
Rodents make up the largest order of mammals, with over 40% of mammalian species. They have two incisors in the upper and lower jaw which grow continually, and must be kept short by gnawing.

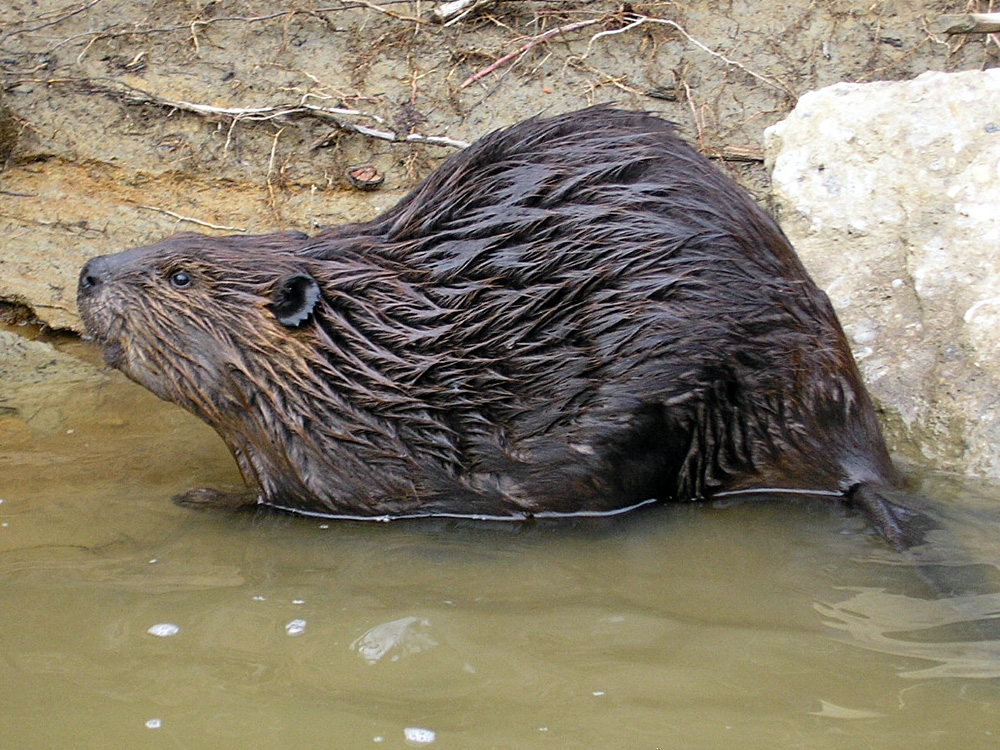
Beaver

- Family Castoridae (beavers)
  - Genus: Castor
    - North American beaver, C. canadensis LC

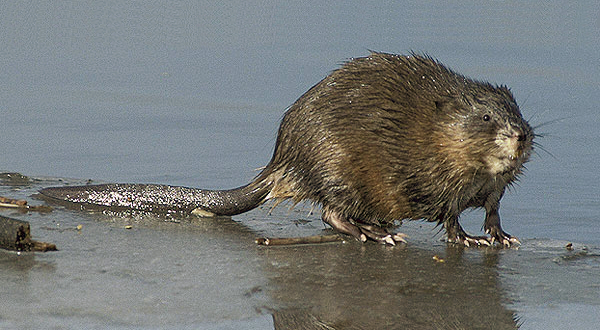
Muskrat

- Family Cricetidae (New World mice, rats, voles, lemmings, muskrats)
  - Genus: Microtus
    - Rock vole, M. chrotorrhinus LC
    - Meadow vole, M. pennsylvanicus LC
      - Gull Island vole, M. p. nesophilus EX
    - Woodland vole, M. pinetorum LC
  - Genus: Clethrionomys
    - Southern red-backed vole, C. gapperi LC
  - Genus: Neotoma
    - Allegheny woodrat, N. magister NT extirpated
  - Genus: Ondatra
    - Muskrat, O. zibethicus LC
  - Genus: Peromyscus
    - White-footed mouse, P. leucopus LC
    - Eastern deermouse, P. maniculatus LC
  - Genus: Synaptomys
    - Northern bog lemming, S. borealis LC
    - Southern bog lemming, S. cooperi LC
- Family Dipodidae (jumping mice)
  - Genus: Napaeozapus
    - Woodland jumping mouse, N. insignis LC
  - Genus: Zapus
    - Meadow jumping mouse, Z. hudsonius LC

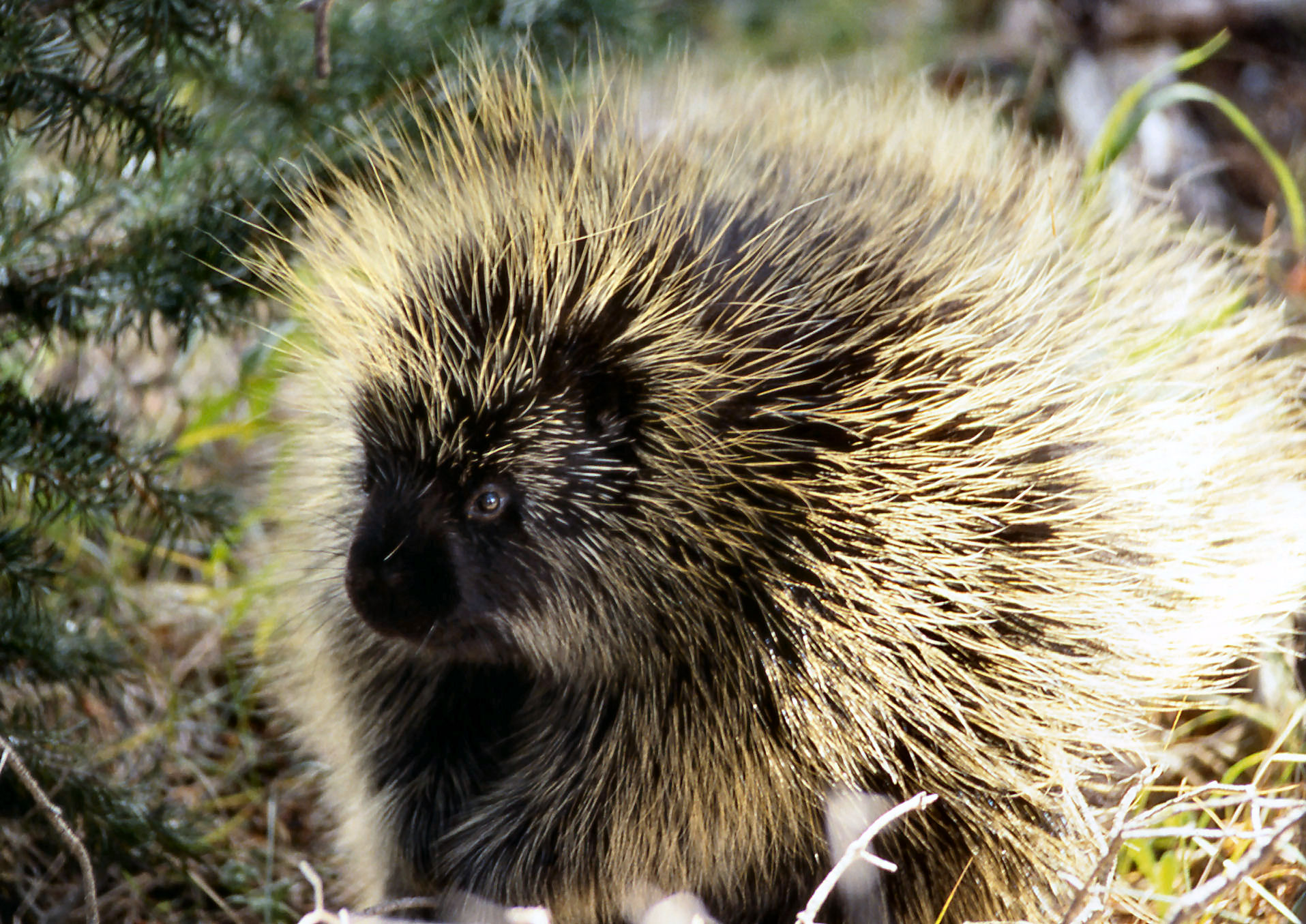
North American porcupine

- Family Erethizontidae (New World porcupines)
  - Genus: Erethizon
    - North American porcupine, E. dorsatum LC

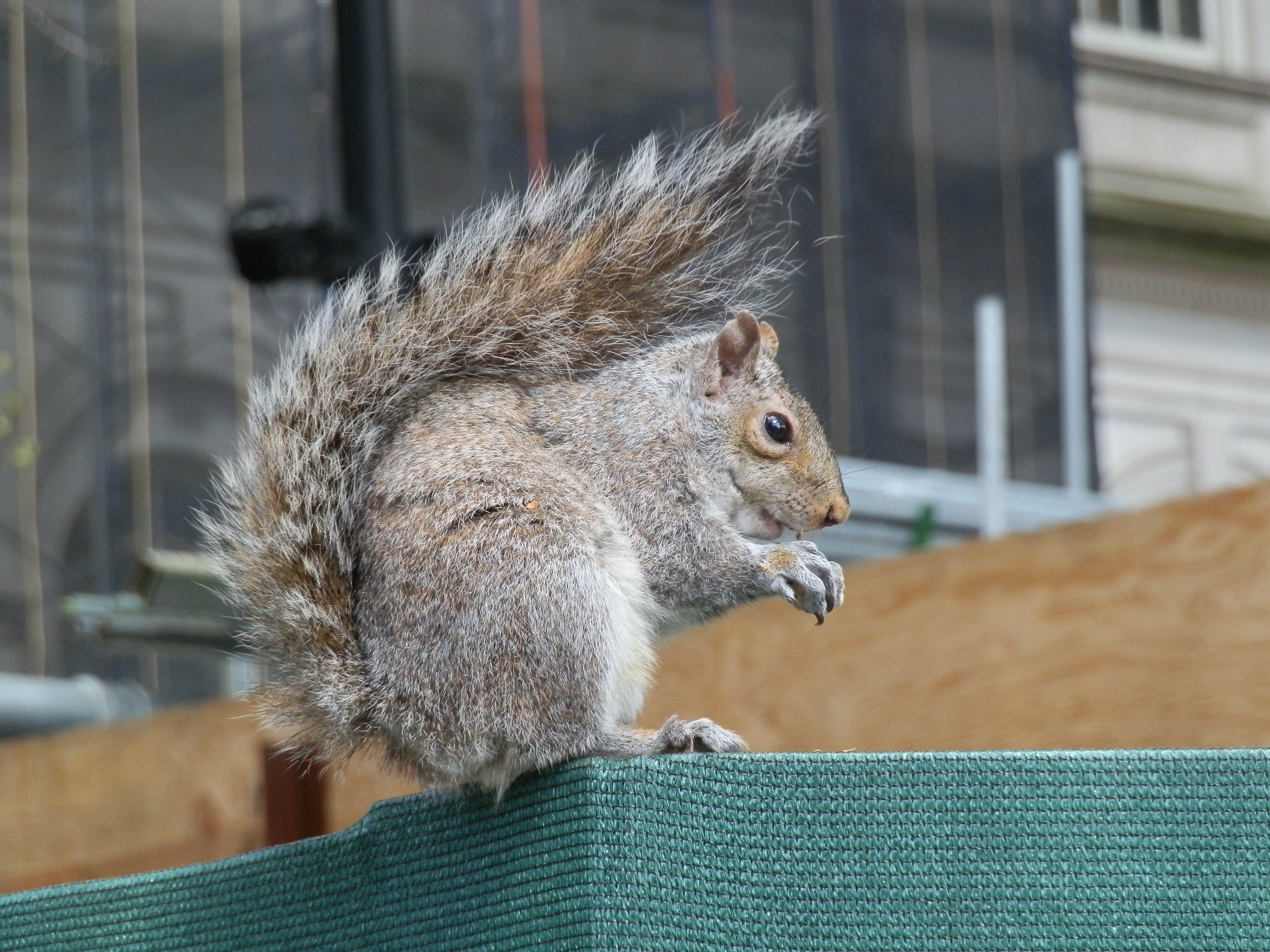
Eastern gray squirrel in Manhattan

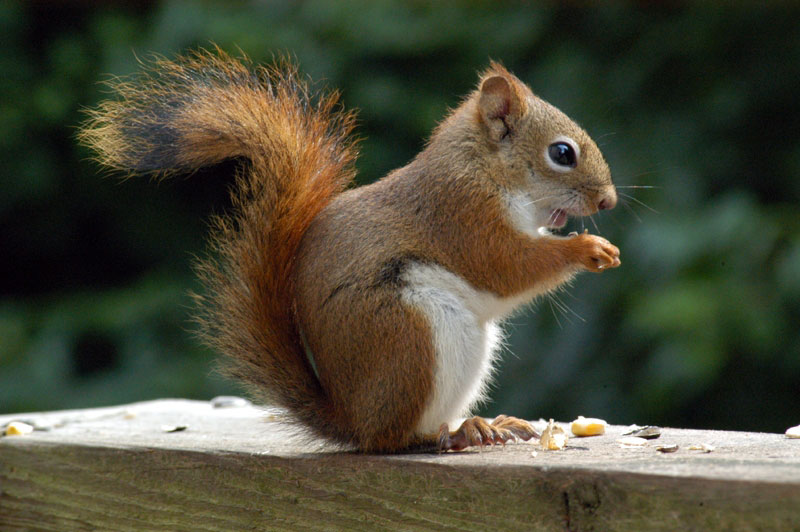
American red squirrel

- Family Muridae (Old World mice and rats)
  - Genus: Mus
    - House mouse, M. musculus LC introduced
  - Genus: Rattus
    - Norway rat, R. norvegicus LC introduced
    - Black rat, R. rattus LC introduced
- Family Sciuridae (squirrels)
  - Genus: Glaucomys
    - Northern flying squirrel, G. sabrinus LC
    - Southern flying squirrel, G. volans LC
  - Genus: Marmota
    - Groundhog, M. monax LC
  - Genus: Sciurus
    - Eastern gray squirrel, S. carolinensis LC
    - Fox squirrel, S. niger LC
  - Genus: Tamias
    - Eastern chipmunk, T. striatus LC
  - Genus: Tamiasciurus
    - American red squirrel, T. hudsonicus LC

== Bats, order Chiroptera ==
The bats' most distinguishing feature is that their forelimbs are developed as wings, making them the only mammals capable of flight. Bat species account for about 20% of all mammals.

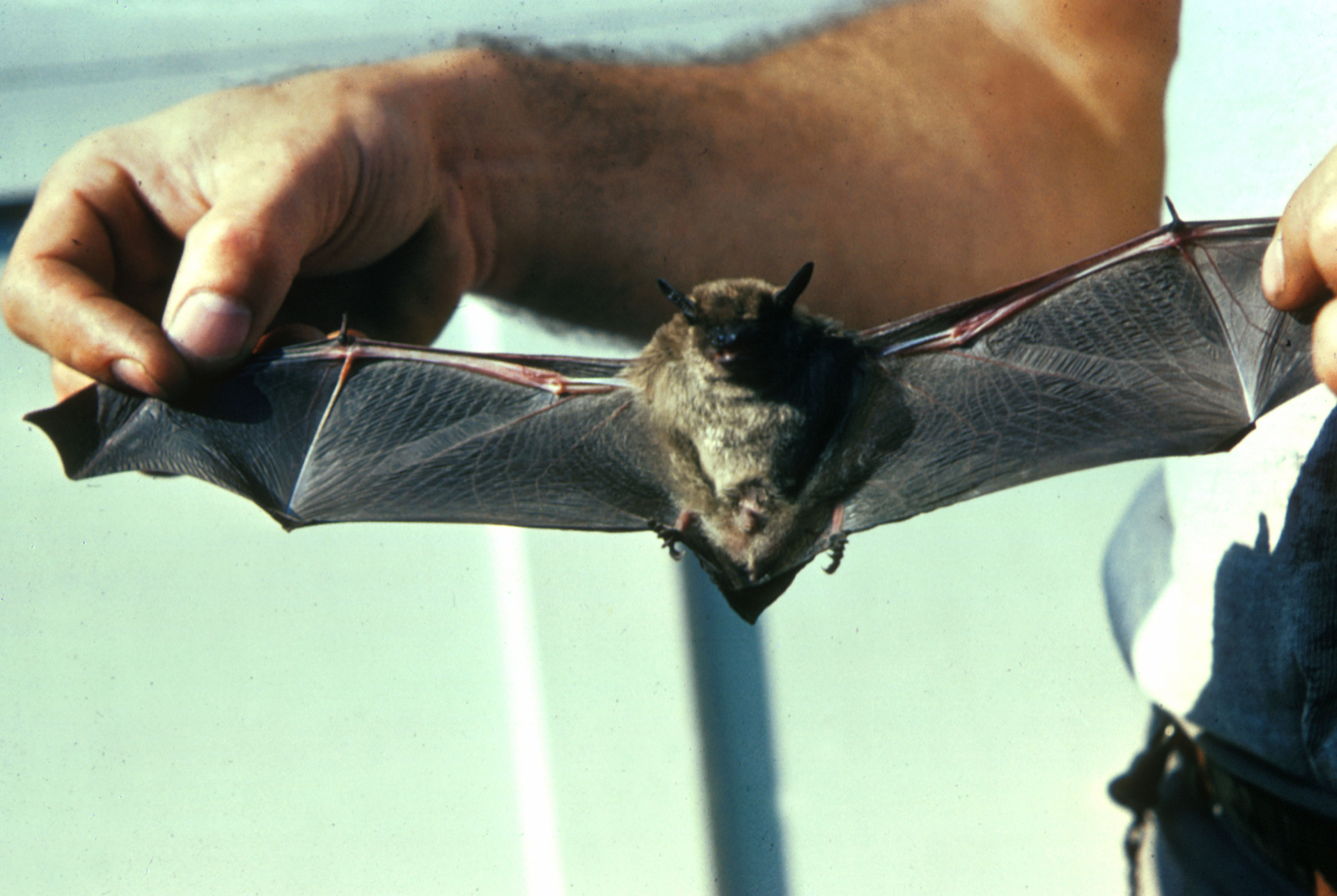
Little brown bat

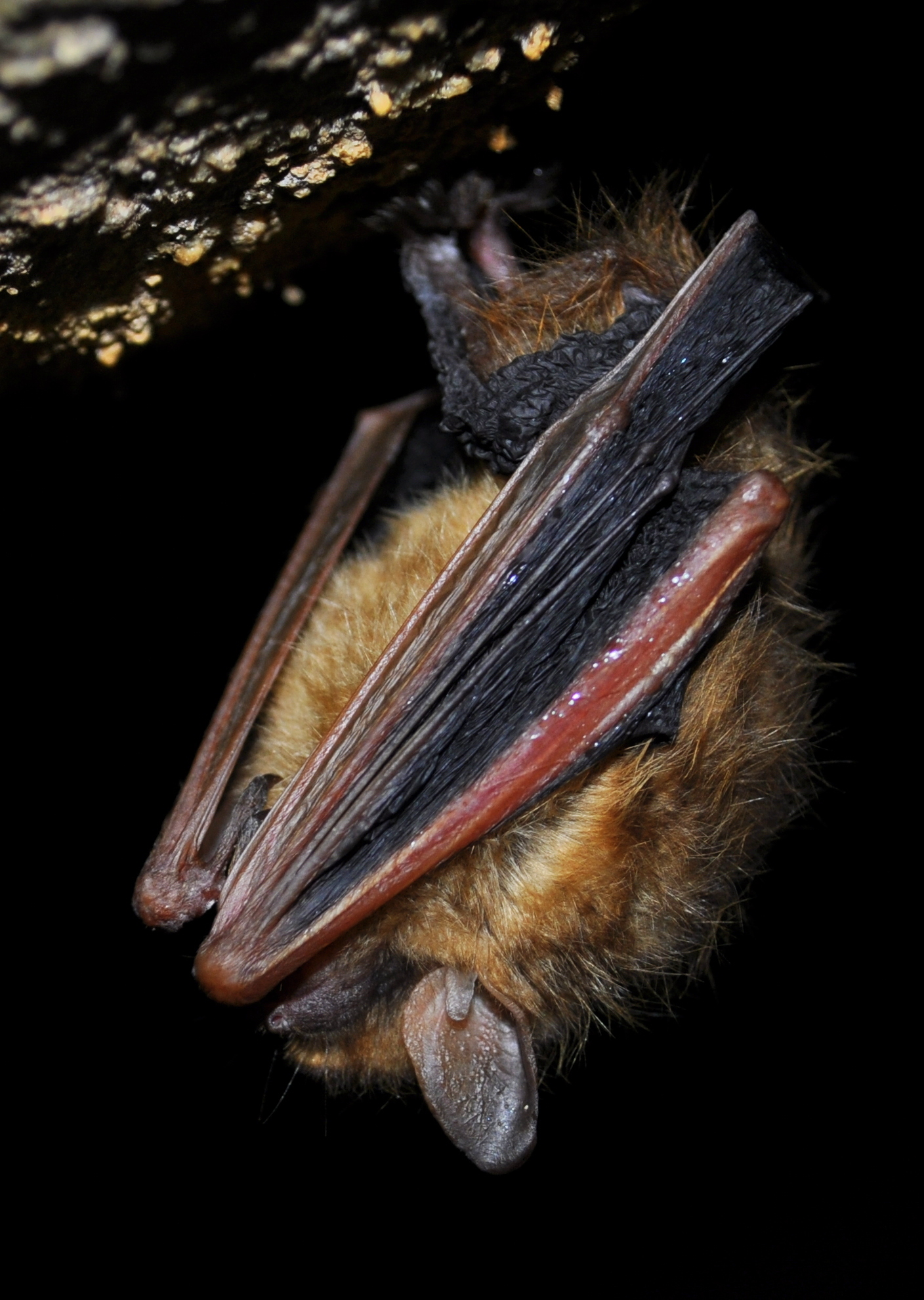
Tricolored bat

- Family Vespertilionidae (vesper bats)
  - Genus: Aeorestes
    - Hoary bat, A. cinereus LC
  - Genus: Eptesicus
    - Big brown bat, E. fuscus LC
  - Genus: Lasionycteris
    - Silver-haired bat, L. noctivagans LC
  - Genus: Lasiurus
    - Eastern red bat, L. borealis LC
    - Seminole bat, L. seminolus LC
  - Genus: Myotis
    - Eastern small-footed bat, M. leibii EN
    - Little brown bat, M. lucifugus EN
    - Northern long-eared bat, M. septentrionalis NT
    - Indiana bat, M. sodalis EN
  - Genus: Perimyotis
    - Tricolored bat, P. subflavus VU

== Carnivores, order Carnivora ==
There are over 260 species of carnivorans, the majority of which feed primarily on meat. They have a characteristic skull shape and dentition.

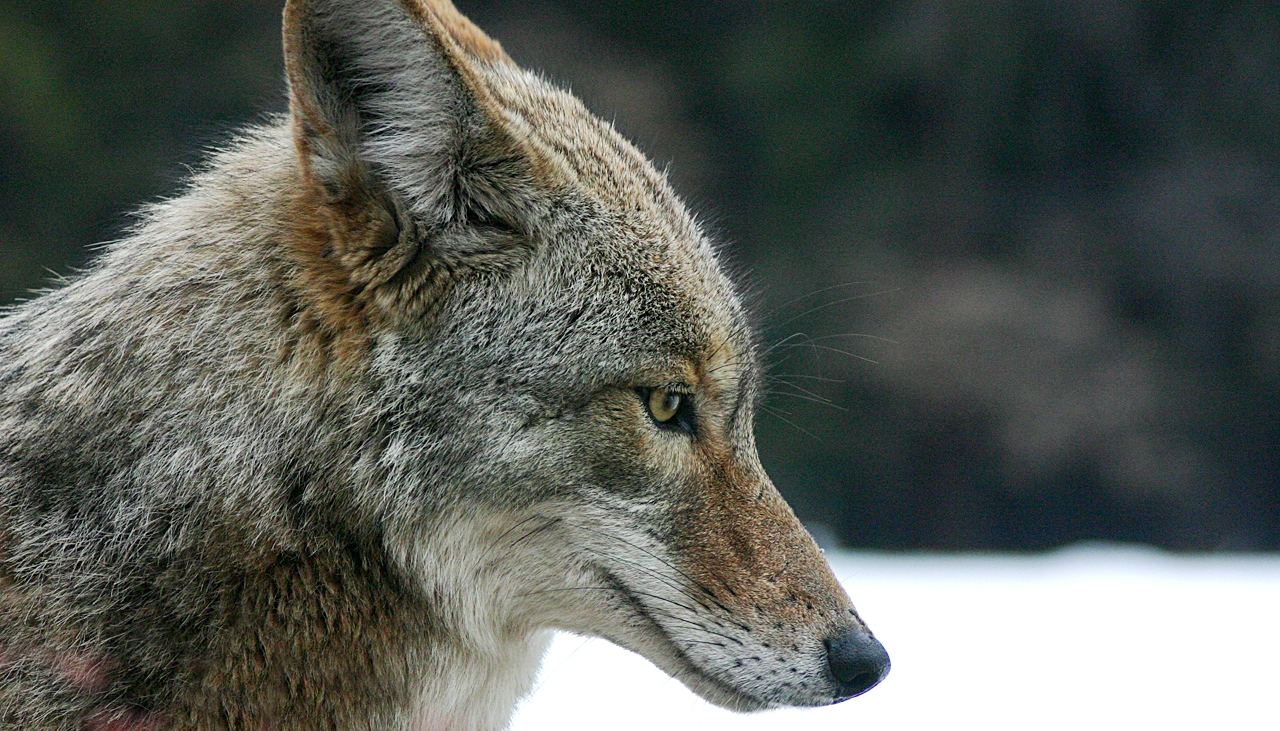
Coyote

- Family Canidae (canids)
  - Genus: Canis
    - Coyote, C. latrans LC
      - Eastern coyote, C. l. ssp.
    - Eastern wolf, C. lycaon extirpated
    - Red wolf, C. rufus CR extirpated
  - Genus: Urocyon
    - Gray fox, U. cinereoargenteus LC
  - Genus: Vulpes
    - Red fox, V. vulpes LC
- Family Procyonidae (raccoons)
  - Genus: Procyon
    - Common raccoon, P. lotor LC

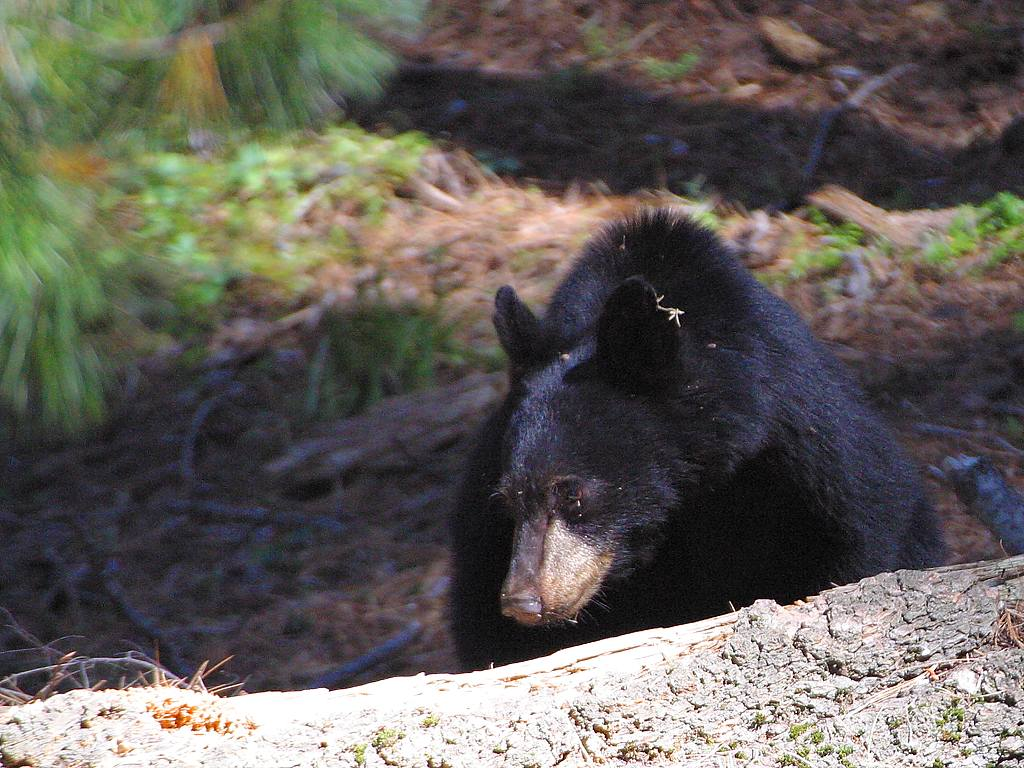
Black bear

- Family Ursidae (bears)
  - Genus: Ursus
    - American black bear, U. americanus LC

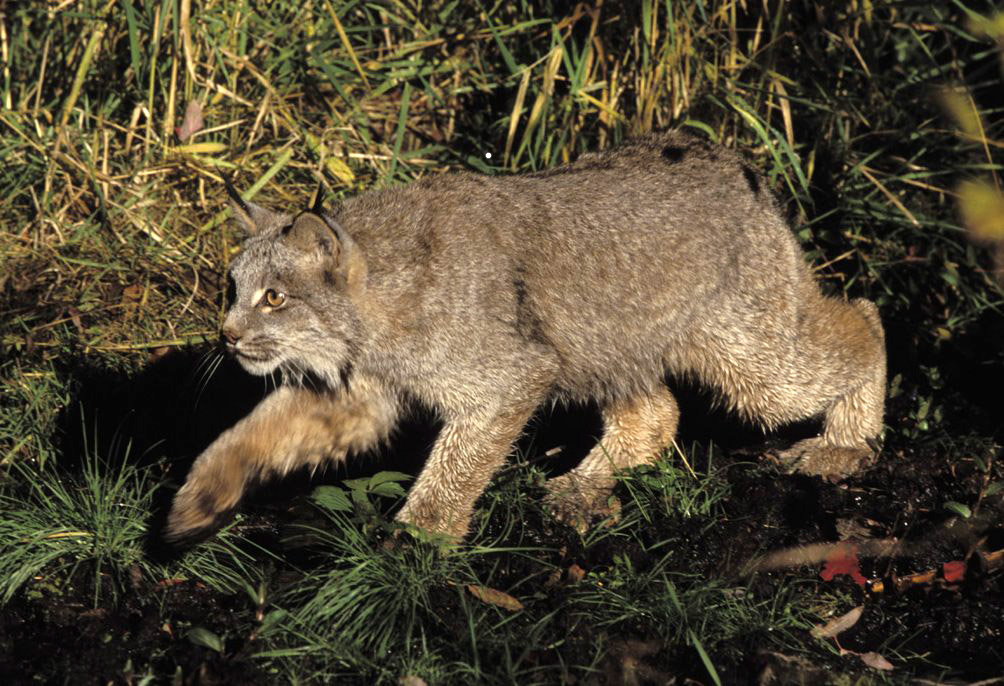
Canada lynx

- Family Felidae (cats)
  - Genus: Lynx
    - Canada lynx, L. canadensis LC extirpated
    - Bobcat, L. rufus LC
    - Challenger Lynx, L. concolor DD
  - Genus: Puma
    - Cougar, P. concolor LC extirpated

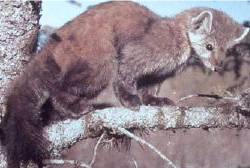
Pine marten

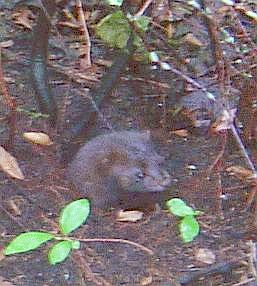
Mink

- Family Mustelidae (weasels, minks, martens, fishers, and otters)
  - Genus: Gulo
    - Wolverine, G. gulo LC extirpated
  - Genus: Lontra
    - North American river otter, L. canadensis LC
  - Genus: Martes
    - American marten, M. americana LC
  - Genus: Mustela
    - Least weasel, M. nivalis LC
    - American ermine, M. richardsonii NE
  - Genus: Neogale
    - Long-tailed weasel, N. frenata LC
    - American mink, N. vison LC
  - Genus: Pekania
    - Fisher, P. pennanti LC
  - Genus: Taxidea
    - American badger, T. taxus LC

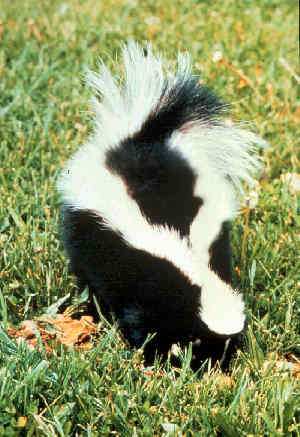
Striped skunk

- Family Mephitidae (skunks)
  - Genus: Mephitis
    - Striped skunk, M. mephitis LC
- Family Phocidae (seals)
  - Genus: Halichoerus
    - Gray seal, H. grypus LC
  - Genus: Pagophilus
    - Harp seal, P. groenlandicus LC
  - Genus: Phoca
    - Harbor seal, P. vitulina LC
  - Genus: Pusa
    - Ringed seal, P. hispida LC

== Even-toed ungulates, order Artiodactyla ==
The even-toed ungulates are ungulates whose weight is borne about equally by the third and fourth toes, rather than mostly or entirely by the third as in perissodactyls.

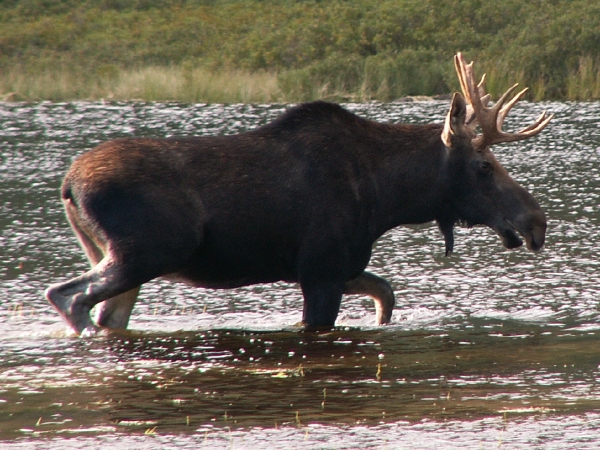
Moose

- Family Cervidae (deer)
  - Genus: Alces
    - Moose, A. alces LC
      - Eastern moose, A. a. americana
  - Genus: Cervus
    - Elk, C. canadensis LC extirpated
      - Eastern elk, C. c. canadensis EX
    - Sika deer, C. nippon LC introduced
  - Genus: Odocoileus
    - White-tailed deer, O. virginianus LC

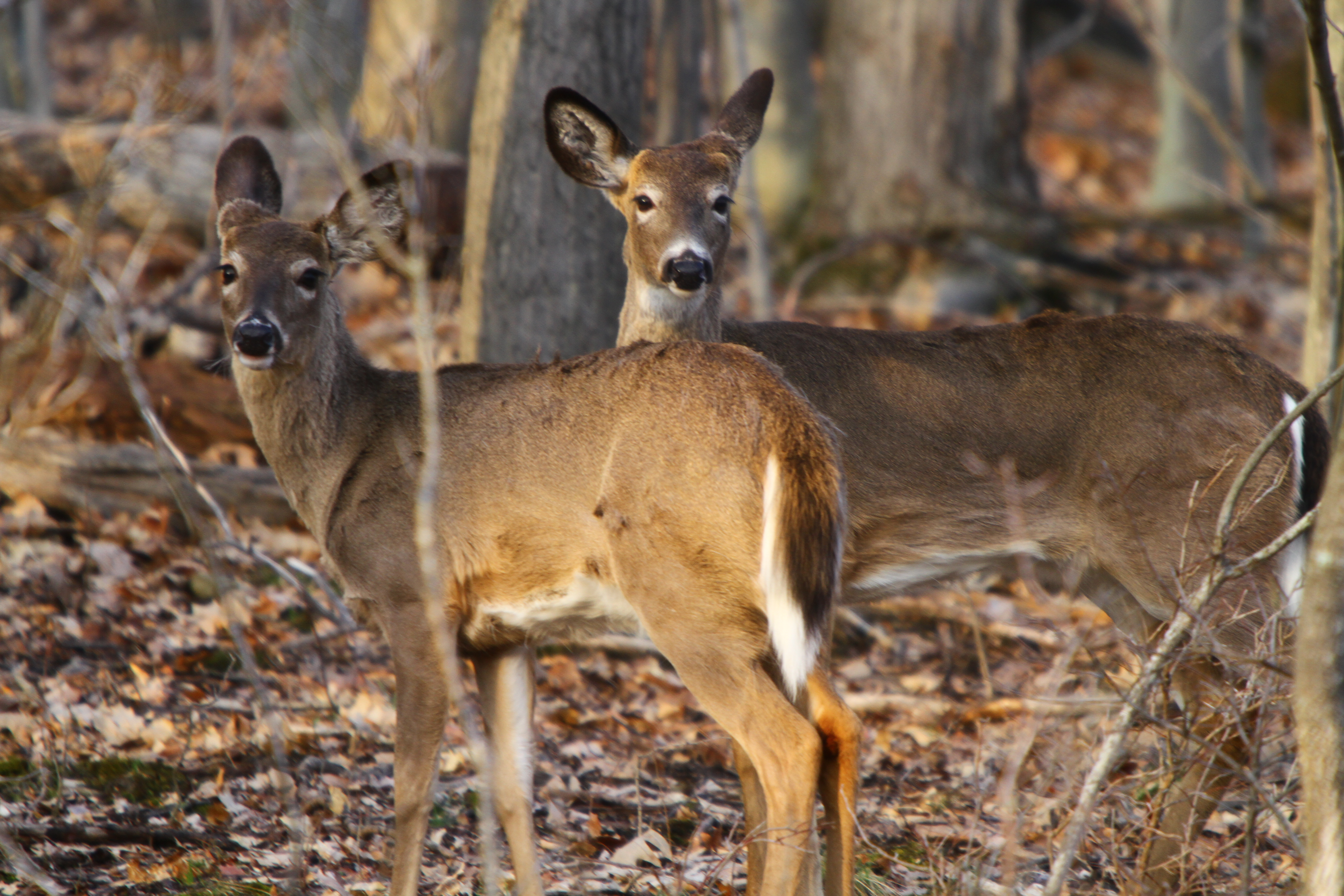
Two white-tailed deer in Broome County

  - Genus: Rangifer
    - Caribou, R. tarandus VU extirpated
      - Boreal woodland caribou, R. t. caribou extirpated
- Family Bovidae (bovids)
  - Genus: Bison
    - American bison, B. bison LC extirpated
- Family Suidae (pigs)
  - Genus: Sus
    - Wild boar, S. scrofa LC introduced, extirpated

== Cetaceans, order Cetacea ==
Cetaceans are the mammals most fully adapted to aquatic life with a spindle-shaped nearly hairless body, protected by a thick layer of blubber, and forelimbs and tail modified to provide propulsion underwater.

- Family Balaenidae (right whales)
  - Genus: Balaena
    - Bowhead whale, B. mysticetus LC
  - Genus: Eubalaena
    - North Atlantic right whale, E. glacialis CR
- Family Balaenopteridae (rorquals)
  - Genus: Balaenoptera
    - Common minke whale, B. acutorostrata LC
    - Sei whale, B. borealis EN
    - Blue whale, B. musculus EN
    - Fin whale, B. physalus VU
  - Genus: Megaptera
    - Humpback whale, M. novaeangliae LC
- Family Kogiidae (false sperm whales)
  - Genus: Kogia
    - Pygmy sperm whale, K. breviceps LC
    - Dwarf sperm whale, K. sima LC
- Family Physeteridae (sperm whales)
  - Genus: Physeter
    - Sperm whale, P. macrocephalus VU
- Family Ziphiidae (beaked whales)
  - Genus: Hyperoodon
    - Northern bottlenose whale, H. ampullatus LC
  - Genus: Mesoplodon
    - Sowerby's beaked whale, M. bidens DD
    - Blainville's beaked whale, M. densirostris DD
    - Gervais' beaked whale, M. europaeus DD
    - True's beaked whale, M. mirus DD
  - Genus: Ziphius
    - Cuvier's beaked whale, Z. cavirostris LC
- Family Monodontinae (narwhal and beluga)
  - Genus: Delphinapterus
    - Beluga whale, D. leucas LC vagrant
- Family Delphinidae (dolphins)
  - Genus: Delphinus
    - Short-beaked common dolphin, D. delphis LC
  - Genus: Globicephala
    - Short-finned pilot whale, G. macrorhynchus LC
    - Long-finned pilot whale, G. melas LC
  - Genus: Grampus
    - Risso's dolphin, G. griseus LC
  - Genus: Lagenorhynchus
    - Atlantic white-sided dolphin, L. acutus LC
  - Genus: Orcinus
    - Orca, O. orca DD
  - Genus: Stenella
    - Clymene dolphin, S. clymene LC
    - Striped dolphin, S. coeruleoalba LC
    - Atlantic spotted dolphin, S. frontalis LC
    - Spinner dolphin, S. longirostris LC
  - Genus: Tursiops
    - Common bottlenose dolphin, T. truncatus LC
- Family Phocoenidae (porpoises)
  - Genus: Phocoena
    - Harbor porpoise, P. phocoena LC

== See also ==
- Seneca white deer
- Rats in New York City
