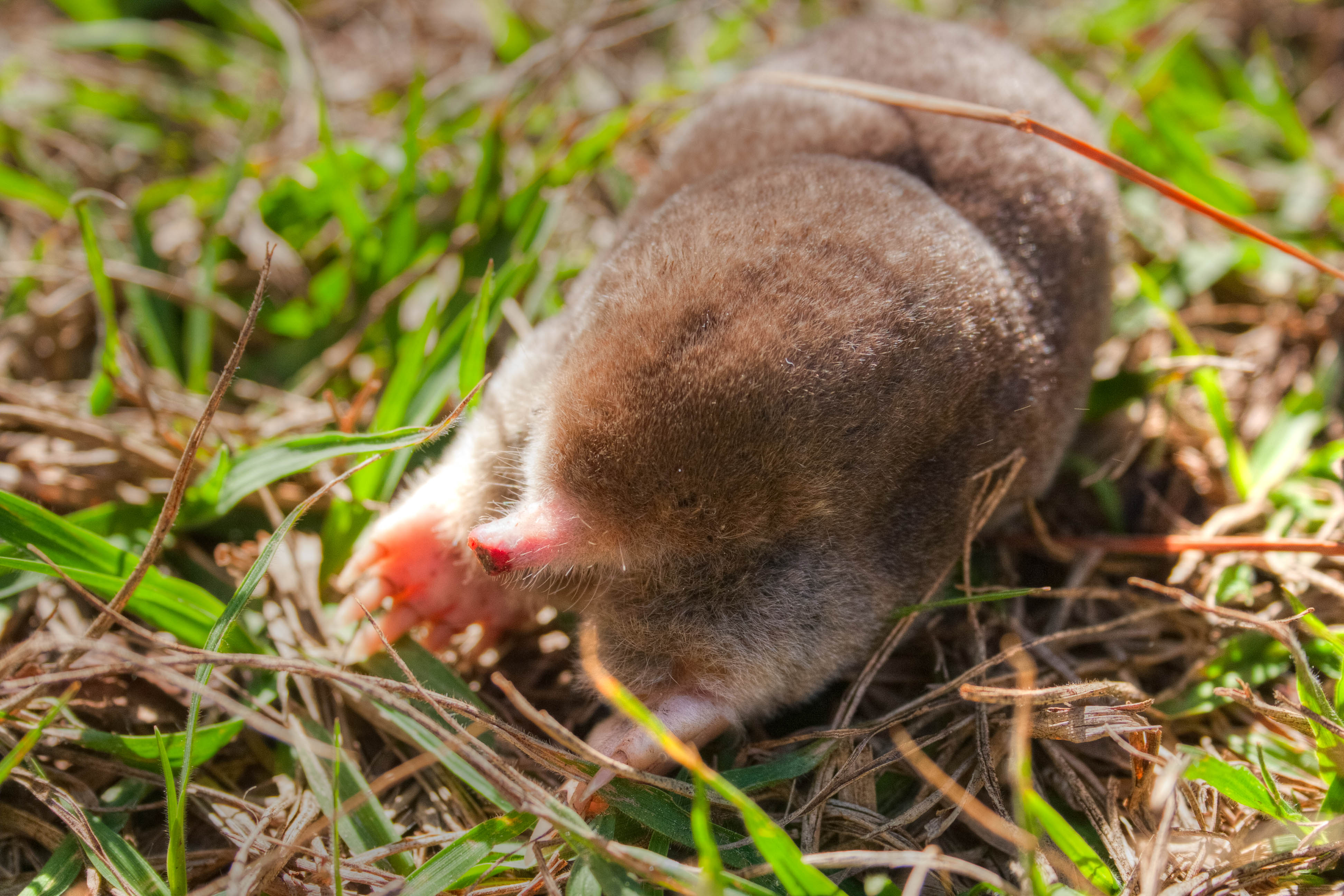
- Eastern mole (Scalopus aquaticus)

Scientific classification
- Kingdom: Animalia
- Phylum: Chordata
- Class: Mammalia
- Order: Eulipotyphla
- Family: Talpidae
- Subfamily: Scalopinae; Gill, 1875

Tribes
- Condylurini; Scalopini

= Scalopinae =

New World moles Temporal range: Late Oligocene–present

Subfamily of mammals

The Scalopinae, or New World moles, are one of three subfamilies of the family Talpidae, which consists of moles and mole-like animals; the other two subfamilies being the Old World talpids (the Talpinae) and the Chinese shrew-like moles (Uropsilinae). The Scalopinae are the only Talpidae subfamily to consist entirely of undisputed moles and no mole-like close relatives such as shrew-moles or desmans.

They are found in temperate North America and parts of China. In North America, they exist virtually everywhere soil conditions permit except northern Canada and those areas of northeastern Mexico where the soil is too sandy. Despite this subfamily being referred to as "New World moles", there are also two species in the mountains of China, each in their own monotypic genus. Morphological and paleontological analyses indicate that both tribes in the subfamily originated in Eurasia during the Oligocene and migrated to North America during the Neogene, with the Condylurini later going extinct throughout their Eurasian range. The Scalopini also migrated at least two different times from North America back to Eurasia, with the two Chinese species likely originating from this. In addition, phylogenetic and morphological evidence supports the Condylurini not belonging in the Scalopinae, and occupying a much more basal position in Talpidae.

== Taxonomy ==
The Scalopininae are divided into two tribes, six genera, and ten species:

- Tribe Condylurini
  - Genus Condylura, the star-nosed mole
- Tribe Scalopini
  - Genus Scalopus, the common eastern mole
  - Genus Scapanus, five species of western moles
  - Genus Parascalops, the hairy-tailed mole
  - Genus Scapanulus, the Gansu mole
  - Genus Alpiscaptulus, the Medog mole
