= Common mole =

Common mole may refer to:

- The eastern mole of North America (Scalopus aquaticus)
- The European mole or northern mole of Europe (Talpa europaea)
