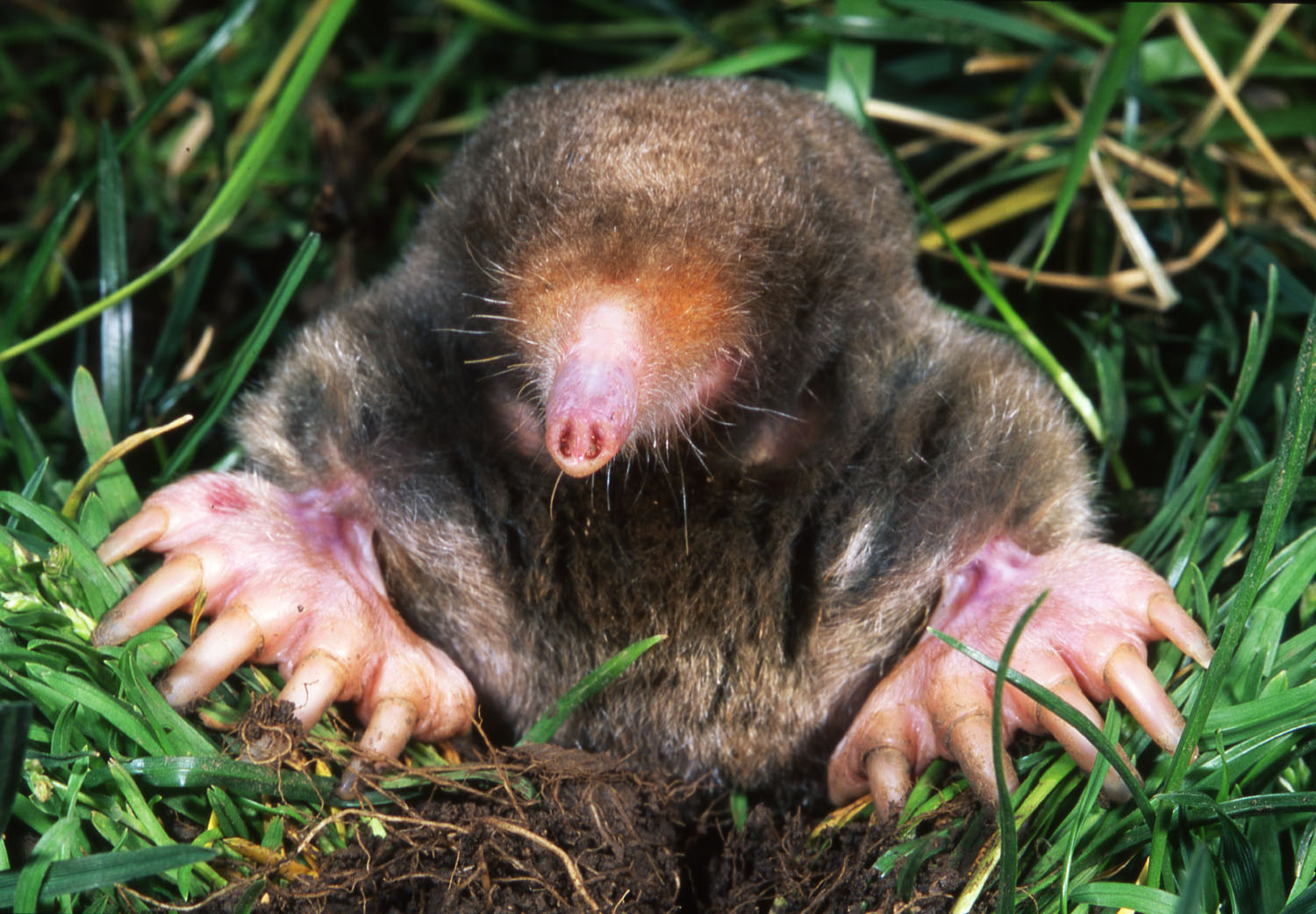
- Eastern mole (Scalopus aquaticus)

Scientific classification
- Kingdom: Animalia
- Phylum: Chordata
- Class: Mammalia
- Order: Eulipotyphla
- Family: Talpidae
- Subfamily: Scalopinae
- Tribe: Scalopini; Gill, 1875

Genera
- 5 genera, see article.

= Scalopini =

Scalopini Temporal range: Late Oligocene–present

Tribe of mammals

The Scalopini are a tribe of moles belonging to the family Talpidae. They include all the New World moles apart from the strikingly distinctive star-nosed mole. As the similarity of the names implies, they are the standard form of the Scalopinae, the North American or New World moles, and can be found virtually anywhere north of Northern Mexico and south of Northern Canada where environmental factors (chiefly the presence of soil) permit.

Although the morphological differences between the Scalopini and the Old World moles are not very apparent to non-experts, they were significant enough for the Gansu mole of China to be taken out of that group and added to the Scalopini in 1938, and in 2021 the Medog mole was also described from China. How New World moles came to live in China was long a mystery, but analyses indicate that the Scalopini originated in Eurasia during the Oligocene and later migrated to North America during the Neogene and diversified there. However, the Gansu and Medog moles are not descendants of the original Old World Scalopini, but rather of New World Scalopini that migrated back to Eurasia; the hairy-tailed mole of North America is more closely related to them than it is to other North American moles. The Scalopini are thought to have migrated from North America back to Eurasia at least two different times. This has prompted scientists to occasionally hesitate to continue calling the Scalopini "New World moles" without some caveat to acknowledge this fact. As a result, the Scalopini are sometimes called "New World moles and relatives".

There are five genera in the Scalopini:

- Alpiscaptulus, the Medog mole of Tibet
- Parascalops, the hairy-tailed mole of northeastern North America
- Scalopus, the common and widely distributed eastern mole
- Scapanulus, the Gansu mole of north-central China
- Scapanus, five species of moles found west of the Rocky Mountains

In addition, these fossil genera are also known:

- †Domninoides
- †Leptoscaptor
- †Mioscalops
- †Proscapanus
- †Scapanoscapter
- †Yanshuella
- †Yuroscaptor
- †Vulcanoscaptor

Some evidence supports dividing the extant members of this genus into two subtribes: Scalopina (containing Scalopus and Scapanus) and Parascalopina (containing Alpiscaptulus, Parascalops, and Scapanulus). The extinct Proscapanus likely represents a basal member falling outside both tribes, Scapanoscapter—and likely Vulcanoscaptor—could belong in the Scalopina, and the other fossil genera, while of uncertain placement, could potentially belong in the Parascalopina.
