= Eimer's organ =

Type of organ

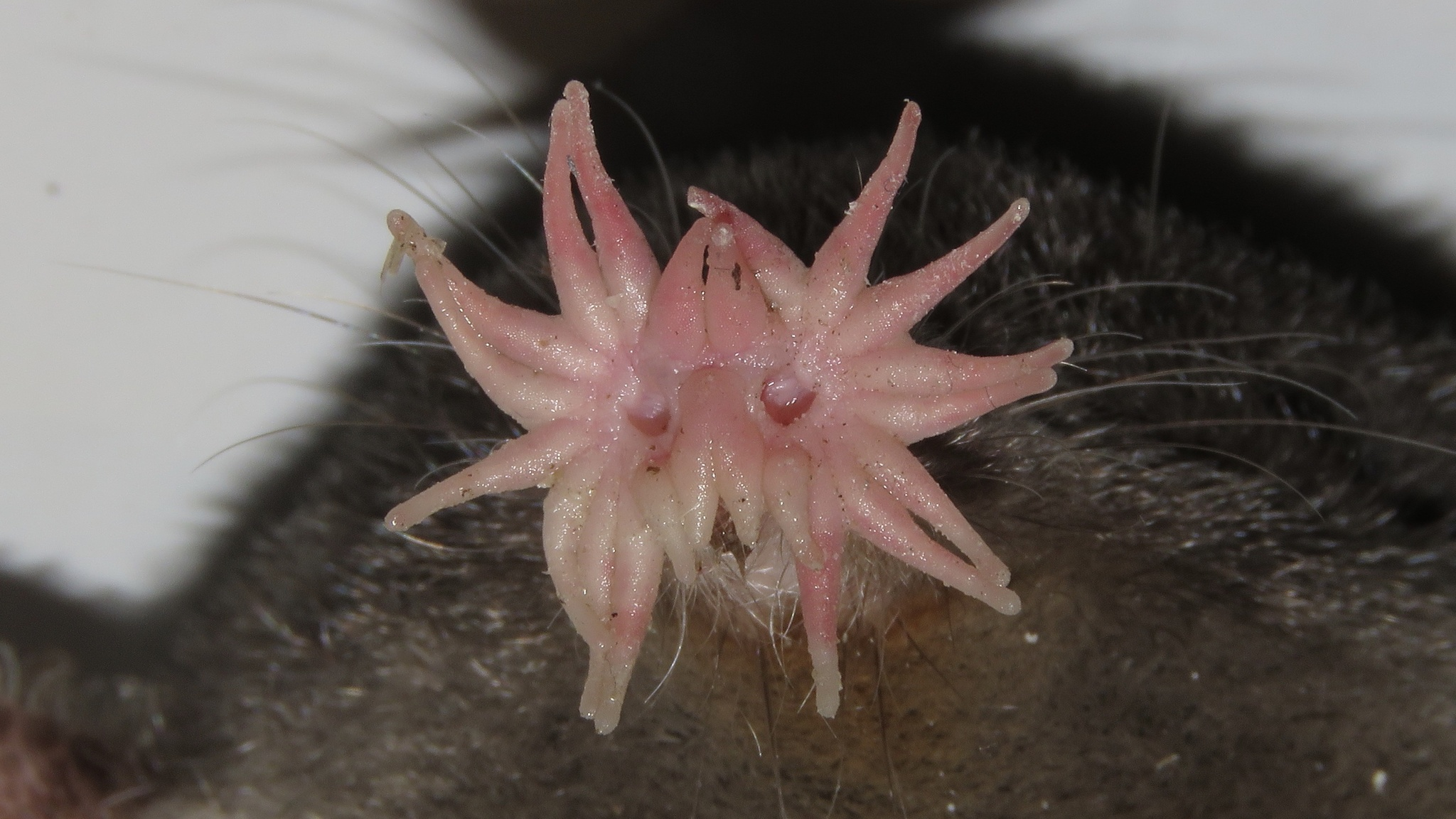
A star-nosed mole's tentacled snout, which bears 25,000 Eimer's organs.

Eimer's organs are organs for the sense of touch, shaped like bulbous papillae, formed from modified epidermis. First isolated by Theodor Eimer from the European mole in 1871, these organs are present in many moles, and are particularly dense on the star-nosed mole, which bears 25,000 of them on its unique tentacled snout. The organs are formed from a stack of epidermal cells, which is innervated by myelinated fibers from the dermis, which form terminal swellings just below the keratinized outer surface of the epidermis. They contain a complex of Merkel cell and neurite in the epidermis, and a lamellated corpuscle in the dermal connective tissue.

== Discovery ==
Theodor Eimer described the discrete microscopic organ of touch that densely populates the tip of the nose of the European mole Talpa europaea. The organ is named in his honour. In his original publication in 1871, he examined the structure of the nose, the distribution of the touch organs on the nasal skin, and the relationship of their density with the nose's use for palpation, to examine or explore by touching. Eimer established a connection between structure and function.

Eimer recognized the importance of the mole's nose to its behaviour. He stated in 1871: "The mole's snout must be the seat of an extraordinarily well developed sense of touch because it replaces almost entirely the animal's sense of face, constituting its only guide on its paths underground." He estimated that the nose of the European mole was covered with more than 5,000 Eimer's organs, which were invested with 105,000 nerve fibres. He took the abundance of sensory innervation (stimulate a nerve or muscle) to affirm his contention that the nose's touch must represent the moles dominant facial sense. Eimer asserted that his interpretation was consistent with the common knowledge of his time. In his publication he noted that the extreme density of highly sensitive nerve fibres is the cause of a light blow to the snout being able to kill the mole instantly. Roughly 130 years after Eimer's discovery, Catania and colleagues recorded in 2004 striking behavioural evidence in favour of his conclusions, using a high-speed camera. Moles with the help of their Eimer's organs may be perfectly poised to detect seismic wave vibrations.

== Structure ==
The organ consists of a minute skin papilla with 0.1–0.2 mm diameter. At the papilla's core, a geometric constellation of nerve fibres with free endings is embedded symmetrically in a column of epithelial cells. Eimer saw two to three single nerve fibres, rising straight in the middle of the column and ending in the fifth layer under the stratum corneum that forms the hard top of the epidermis. The fibres extend short protrusions perpendicularly into each epithelial layer they traverse, where the protrusions end in 'buttons'. They are ringed by a circle of roughly 19 evenly spaced nerve fibres, known as satellite fibres, whose protrusions point inwards. In addition, Eimer distinguished a separate set of nerve fibres with free nerve endings. By contrast to the fibres in the papilla's core, these travel obliquely toward the surface at the papilla's perimeter.

With improved histological techniques, a second touch receptor type, Merkel cell-neurite complexes, was found in the stratum germinativum at the bottom of the epidermis, and a third, lamellated corpuscles of Vater and Pacini, was discovered in the stratum papillare of the dermis underneath the Merkel cells as published by Halata in 1975.

== Function ==
Today it is still not understood precisely how these receptors convert touch into the electrical signals that the nerve fibres transmit to the brain. Interesting are the properties of touch, e.g. frequency and force, to which the receptors respond and how their responsiveness changes with prolonged stimulation. The receptors can be functionally distinguished based on these features:

- The nerve fibers with free nerve endings
- The nerve fibers which end on Merkel cells adapt their responses to touch rapidly
- The nerve fibers which end in the lamellated corpuscles and which are considered slowly adapting

Marasco et al. attribute different functions to Eimer's two sets of free-ending nerve fibres in the star-nosed mole and the coast mole Scapanus orarius. The authors published micrographs of the organ and its innervation, depicting Eimer's free-ending fibers as well as the Merkel cell-neurite complexes and the Vater-Pacini corpuscles. Using a histochemical marker for a protein known to be involved in the processing of pain, they were able to label the nerve fibres at the perimeter of the papilla, suggesting that they are nociceptive, i.e. they respond to pain. By contrast, the fibres in papilla's core did not stain for the protein, suggesting that they are mechano-receptive. These nerve fibres as well as the Merkel cell-neurite complexes are known to respond to local touches with great sensitivity, whereas the Vater-Pacini corpuscles are highly tuned to the frequencies of dispersed vibrations. Eimer's organ, therefore, forms a receptor complex, integrating pain receptors as well as three fundamentally different types of touch receptors which preferentially respond to either skin indentations or vibrations. The follicles of whiskers, also known as vibrissae or sinus hairs, and the push rods in monotremes, as published by Proske et al., represent the only other known discrete structures in the skin that combine three mechanoreceptor types.

The Eimer's organs on the nose may be the mole's main tool with which the animal can capture a refined picture of its underground habitat. Catania and Kaas have shown that the nose of the star-nosed mole is mapped in multiple topographic representations on an extraordinarily large swath of cerebral cortex that processes touch. Discrete morphological modules of nerve cells that are clearly discernible in histologically stained sections represent each ray in the same order as they surround the nose. This topographic morphological representation of the sensory periphery is similar to that of the facial whiskers by cytoarchitectonic modules called barrels in the rodent cerebral cortex.

To date, two complete cortical maps of the nose with its rays have been found in the brain of the star-nosed mole. There may be more. The nose's disproportionate representation in cerebral cortex is suggestive of a fovea for nose touch in the mole's somatic sensory system, as published by Catania.

== Sources ==
- Peter Melzer: 'The Beautiful Eimer's Organ,' 1 May 2010.
- K C Catania: 'Magnified cortex in star-nosed moles.' Nature 375, (1995): 453–454.
- K C Catania, F E Remple: 'Tactile foveation in the star-nosed mole.' Brain Behav Evol 63 (2004): 1–12.
- K C Catania, J H Kaas: 'Organization of the somatosensory cortex of the star-nosed mole.' J Comp Neurol 351 (1995): 549–567.
- T Eimer: 'Die Schnauze des Maulwurfs als Tastwerkzeug.' Arch Micr Anat 7, (1873): 181–201.
- Z Halata: 'The mechanoreceptors of the mammalian skin ultrastructure and morphological classification.' Adv Anat Embryol Cell Biol 50, (1975): 3-77.
- P D Marasco, P R Tsuruda, D M Bautista, D Julius, K C Catania: 'Neuroanatomical evidence for segregation of nerve fibers conveying light touch and pain sensation in Eimer's organ of the mole.' Proc Natl Acad Sci USA 103, (2006): 9339–9344.
- U Proske, J E Gregory, A Iggo: 'Sensory receptors in monotremes.' Philos Trans R Soc Lond B Biol Sci 353, (1998): 1187–1198.
