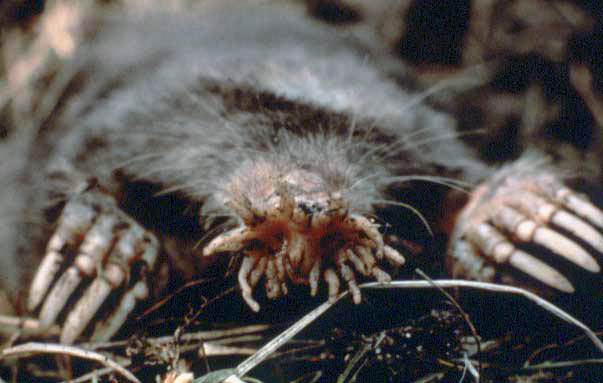
- Star-nosed mole (Condylura cristata)

Scientific classification
- Kingdom: Animalia
- Phylum: Chordata
- Class: Mammalia
- Order: Eulipotyphla
- Family: Talpidae
- Subfamily: Scalopinae
- Tribe: Condylurini; Gill, 1875
- Genus: Condylura; Illiger, 1811

Type species
- Sorex cristatus Linnaeus, 1758

Species
- Condylura cristata; †Condylura izabellae; †Condylura kowalskii; †Condylura sp. - Kazakhstan

= Condylura =

Condylura Temporal range: Mid Miocene - Recent 12–0 Ma

Genus of mammal

Condylura is a genus of moles that contains a single extant species, the star-nosed mole (Condylura cristata) endemic to the northern parts of North America. It is also the only living member of the tribe Condylurini.

While today endemic to New World, fossil evidence suggests the genus was once much more widespread, with two named species (C. kowalskii and C izabellae) known from the Pliocene of Poland and an unnamed species from the Mid Miocene of Kazakhstan.

Condylura is classified along with other New World moles in the subfamily Scalopinae by most authorities; however, more recent studies suggest that it occupies a much more basal position in Talpidae, being sister to a clade comprising the fossil genus Geotrypus, all living Talpinae, and all Scalopini. The extinct genus Eotalpa could potentially be a sister genus to it.
