= Yunoscaptor =

Yunoscaptor Temporal range: Miocene

Scientific classification
- Kingdom: Animalia
- Phylum: Chordata
- Class: Mammalia
- Order: Eulipotyphla
- Family: Talpidae
- Genus: †Yunoscaptor; Storch and Qiu, 1991
- Species: †Y. scalprum

Binomial name
- †Yunoscaptor scalprum Storch and Qiu, 1991

Extinct genus of mammals

Yunoscaptor is an extinct genus of talpid that lived in Eurasia during the Miocene. It contains the only species Yunoscaptor scalprum.

== Distribution ==
Yunoscaptor scalprum is known from the latest Miocene of China.
