= Medog mole =

Scientific classification
- Kingdom: Animalia
- Phylum: Chordata
- Class: Mammalia
- Order: Eulipotyphla
- Family: Talpidae
- Subfamily: Scalopinae
- Tribe: Scalopini
- Genus: Alpiscaptulus; Chen et al., 2021
- Species: A. medogensis

Binomial name
- Alpiscaptulus medogensis Chen et al., 2021
- Medog mole range

Species of mammal

The Medog mole (Alpiscaptulus medogensis) is a species of mammal in the family Talpidae. It is the only member of the genus Alpiscaptulus. It is endemic to Tibet, where it is only found in the vicinity of Namcha Barwa in Medog County.

== Taxonomy ==
Alongside the Gansu mole (Scapanulus oweni), another mole species in a monotypic genus that is also endemic to the mountains of China, it is one of only two species in the subfamily Scalopinae found outside of North America. Phylogenetic and fossil evidence indicates that the scalopine moles evolved in Eurasia and migrated to North America during the Neogene; however, the Gansu and Medog moles are not relict Eurasian scalopine moles, but are descendants of North American scalopine moles that migrated back to Eurasia; the hairy-tailed mole (Parascalops breweri) of North America is more closely related to them than it is to the other two North American scalopine genera.

Phylogenetic evidence supports the Gansu and Medog moles being the closest living relatives of one another and diverging the mid-late Miocene, about 11.59 million years ago. It is thought that the rapid uplift of the Tibetan Plateau and the subsequent climate change led to the divergence of the two genera. Their habitats may have served as refugia during periods of glaciation, allowing them to persist while most other Eurasian scalopines went extinct.

== Habitat ==
This species is known only from the slopes of Namcha Barwa, the highest peak of the eastern Himalayas and 27th tallest mountain on Earth, where two specimens have been collected from burrows at 2,400 metres (7,900 ft) and 3,700 metres (12,100 ft) asl. The individual at 2,400 m was found in a brushy habitat dominated by oak (Quercus) species with abundant grass cover. The individual at 3,700 m was found in a heath forest with mixed bamboo forests. Both these habitats belong to the Eastern Himalayan broadleaf forests ecoregion.

== See also ==
- List of living mammal species described in the 2020s
