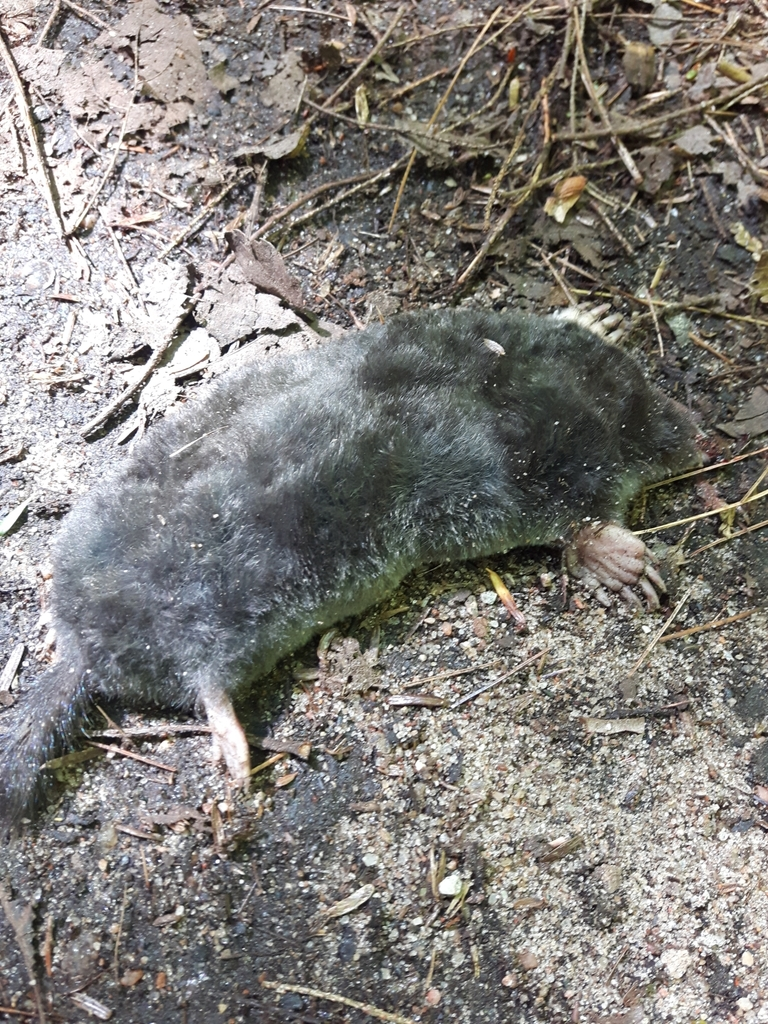

Conservation status
- Least Concern (IUCN 3.1)

Scientific classification
- Kingdom: Animalia
- Phylum: Chordata
- Class: Mammalia
- Infraclass: Placentalia
- Order: Eulipotyphla
- Family: Talpidae
- Tribe: Scalopini
- Genus: Parascalops; True, 1894
- Species: P. breweri

Binomial name
- Parascalops breweri (Bachman, 1842)
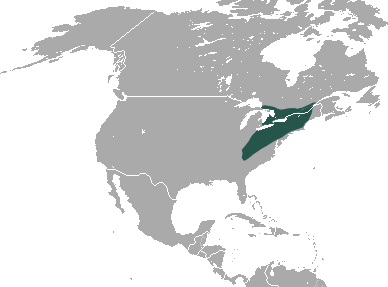
- Hairy-tailed mole range

Synonyms
- Scalops breweri Bachman, 1842

= Hairy-tailed mole =

Species of mammal

The hairy-tailed mole (Parascalops breweri), also known as Brewer's mole, is a medium-sized North American mole. It is the only member of the genus Parascalops. The species epithet breweri refers to Thomas Mayo Brewer, an American naturalist.

== Taxonomy ==
Despite inhabiting North America, studies indicate that it is not closely related to the two other North American scalopine moles (Scalopus and Scapanus), but rather to the two Chinese scalopine moles (Scapanulus and Alpiscaptulus). This indicates that the two Chinese moles likely descend from a migration from North America back into Eurasia, where the scalopine moles originated. Some studies have suggested placing Parascalops, Scapanulus, and Alpiscaptulus into a single subtribe Parascalopina.

== Appearance ==
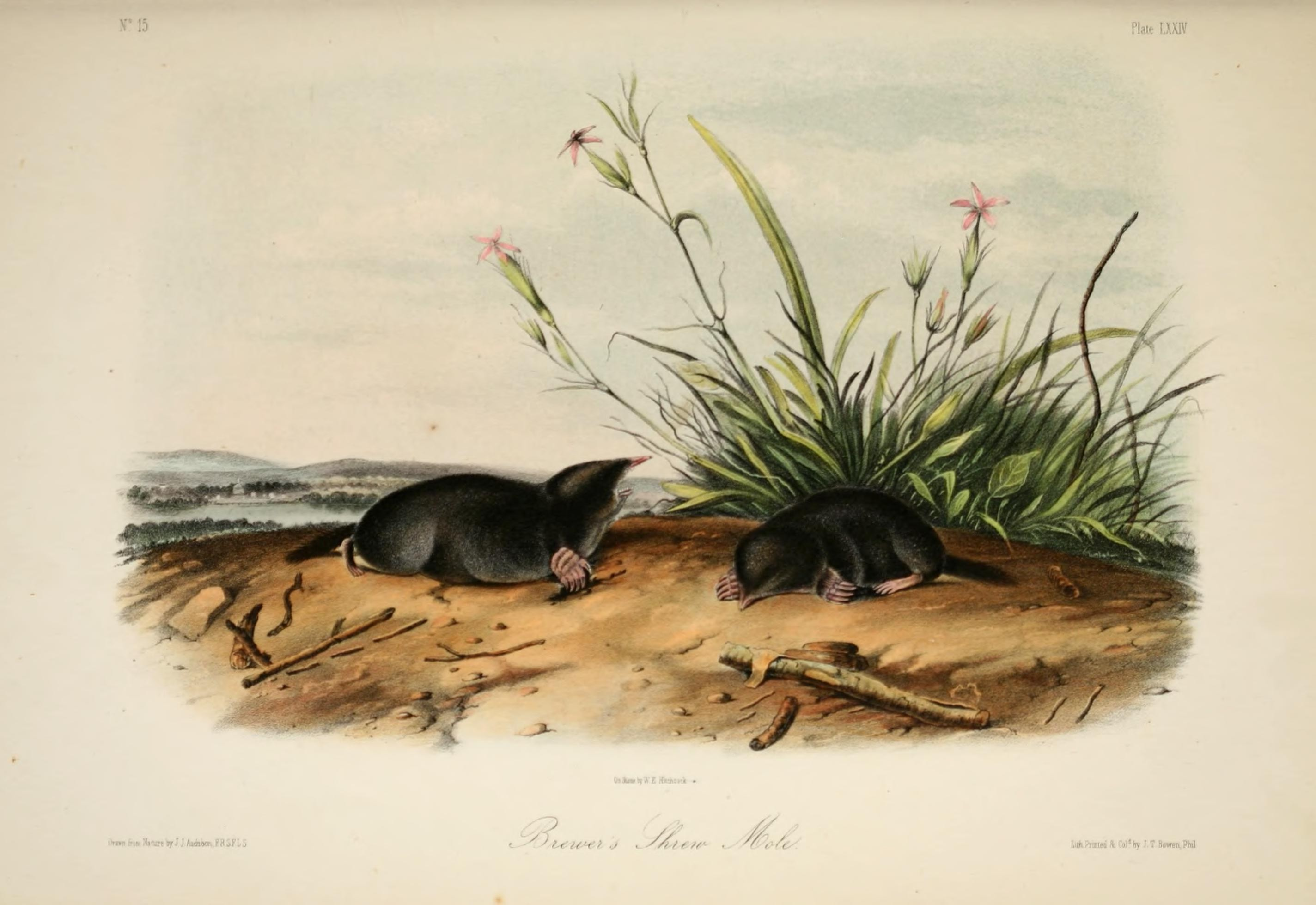
Illustration of the Hairy-tailed mole

This animal has dark grey fur with lighter underparts, a pointed nose and a short, hairy tail. It is about 15 centimeters (5.9 in) in length, including a 3-centimeter-long (1.2 in) tail, and weighs about 55 grams (1.9 oz). Its front paws are broad and spade-shaped, specialized for digging. It has 44 teeth. Its eyes are covered by fur and its ears are not external. Its feet and snout are pinkish, but become white in older animals. Several adaptations to living primarily underground can be seen in the hairy-tailed mole. Its pelage is very dense and silky, and its feet are broad, flat, and heavy. Moles rely very little on their eyesight and have very small optic nerves. To accommodate its lack of vision, the hairy-tailed mole has sensitive whiskers and hairs on the tip of its nose and feet to feel its surroundings.

== Habitat ==
It is found in forested and open areas with dry loose soils in eastern Canada and the northeastern United States. Since it is a fossorial mammal, it needs moist but well-drained soil so that it can dig easily. The hairy-tailed mole prefers deciduous and coniferous woods, oldfields, and roadsides.

== Behavior ==
The hairy-tailed mole is cathemeral. Since it lives primarily underground in shallow tunnels it can forage throughout the day and will also forage on the ground's surface at night. The hairy-tailed mole is more active near the surface during warmer summer months and digs deeper underground in the cooler fall and winter months.

This mole spends most of its time underground, foraging in shallow burrows for insects and their larvae and earthworms. It emerges at night to feed. It is active year-round. Predators include Virginia opossums, northern short-tailed shrews, great gray owls, dogs, American bullfrogs, bobcats, red foxes, and northern copperheads.

This animal is mainly solitary except during mating in early spring. The female has a litter of 4 to 5 young in a deep burrow. This mole may live 3 to 4 years.

== Diet ==
Hairy-tailed moles are insectivores and have been shown to starve if vegetable matter is the only food source available. The hairy-tailed mole's diet is mostly grubs, earthworms, beetle larvae, slugs, and ants, particularly when other food sources are not available.
