= Gansu mole =

Conservation status
- Least Concern (IUCN 3.1)

Scientific classification
- Kingdom: Animalia
- Phylum: Chordata
- Class: Mammalia
- Order: Eulipotyphla
- Family: Talpidae
- Tribe: Scalopini
- Genus: Scapanulus; Thomas, 1912
- Species: S. oweni

Binomial name
- Scapanulus oweni Thomas, 1912
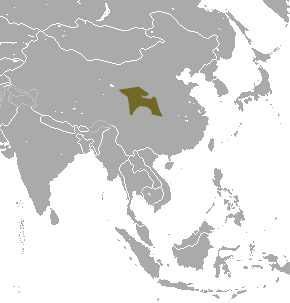
- Gansu mole range

Species of mammal

The Gansu mole (Scapanulus oweni) is a species of mammal in the family Talpidae endemic to central China, where it occurs in Shaanxi, Gansu, Sichuan, and Qinghai. It is the only species in the genus Scapanulus.

Along with the Medog mole (Alpiscaptulus medogensis), which is also found in the mountains of China, the Gansu mole is the only member of the tribe Scalopini to not live in North America. Phylogenetic and fossil evidence indicates that the scalopine moles evolved in Eurasia and migrated to North America during the Neogene; however, the Gansu and Medog moles are not relict Eurasian scalopine moles, but are descendants of North American scalopine moles that migrated back to Eurasia; the hairy-tailed mole (Parascalops breweri) of North America is more closely related to them than it is to the other two North American scalopine genera.

Phylogenetic evidence supports the Gansu and Medog moles being the closest living relatives of one another and diverging the mid-late Miocene, about 11.59 million years ago. It is thought that the uplift of the Tibetan Plateau and the subsequent climate change isolated the two genera in different habitats, leading to their divergence. The habitats for both species may have served as refugia during periods of glaciation, allowing them to persist while most other Eurasian scalopines went extinct.

The morphology of the Gansu mole indicates that it will fall in the Scalopini tribe. All scolopines are distributed in Central America;however, Gansu moles are distributed in the Central and Southwest areas of China. The first specimen of Scapanulus oweni was found by G. Fenwick Owen in 1911 in Gansu, China. The genome of the species is 16,826 bases in length and contains 13 protein-coding genes, 22 transfer genes, 2 ribosomal RNA genes and a displacement loop gene.
