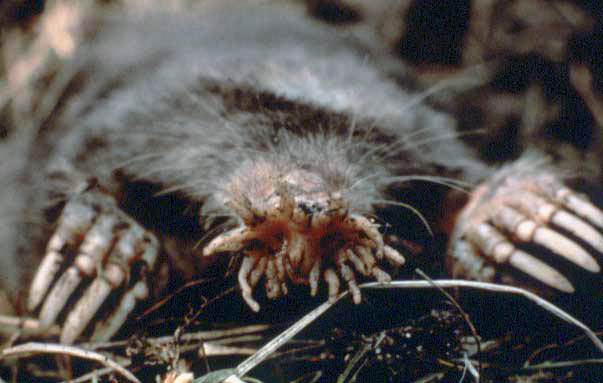

Conservation status
- Least Concern (IUCN 3.1)

Scientific classification
- Kingdom: Animalia
- Phylum: Chordata
- Class: Mammalia
- Order: Eulipotyphla
- Family: Talpidae
- Genus: Condylura
- Species: C. cristata

Binomial name
- Condylura cristata (Linnaeus, 1758)
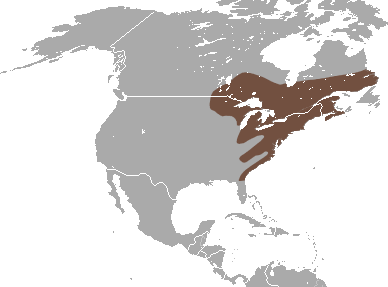
- Star-nosed mole range

Synonyms
- Sorex cristatus Linnaeus, 1758

= Star-nosed mole =

Species of mole

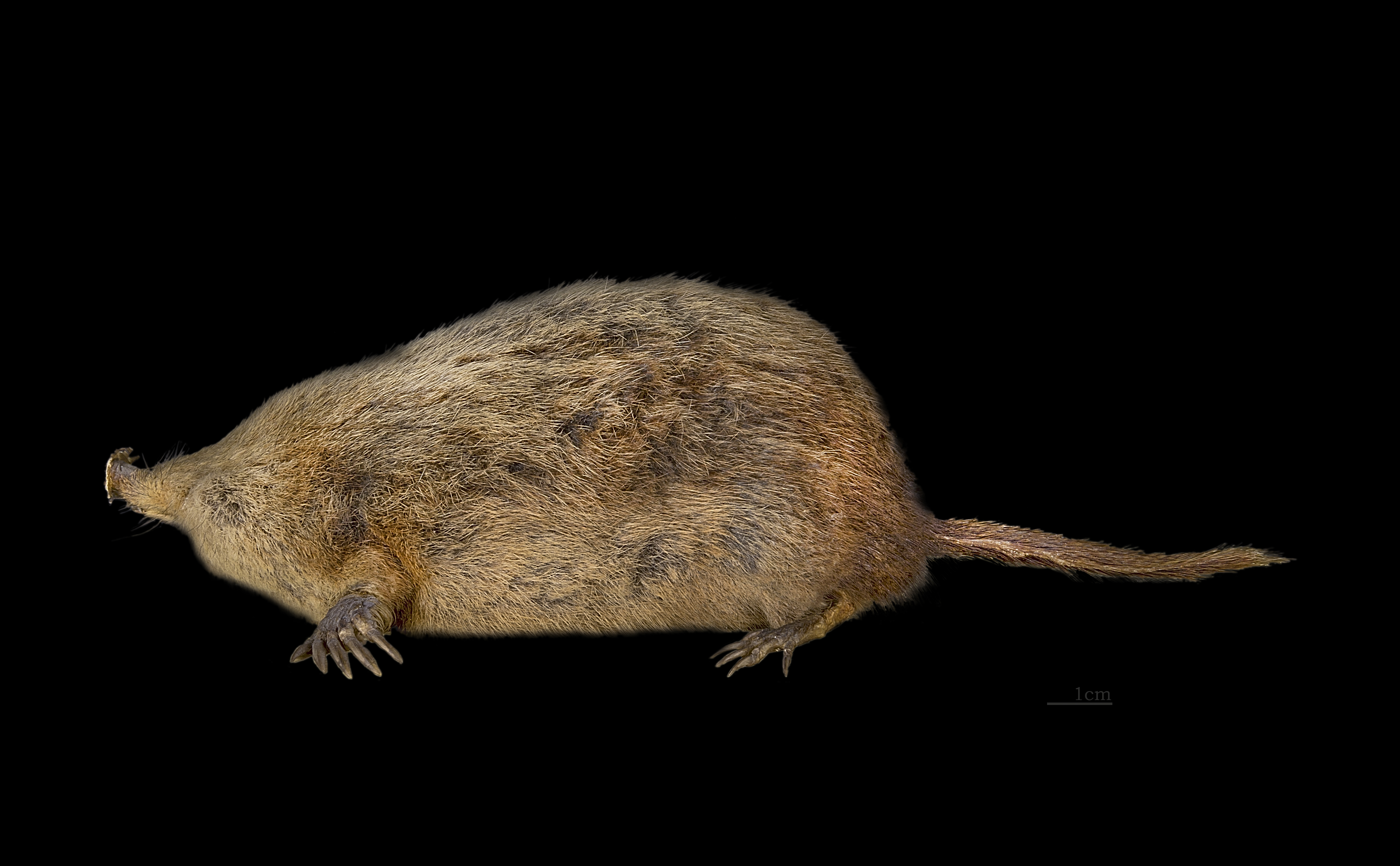
A specimen from the collection of the Muséum de Toulouse

The star-nosed mole (Condylura cristata) is a small semiaquatic mole found in moist, low elevation areas in the northeastern parts of North America. It is the only extant member of the tribe Condylurini and genus Condylura. It has more than 25,000 minute sensory receptors in touch organs, known as Eimer's organs, with which this hamster-sized mole feels its way around. With the help of its Eimer's organs, it may be perfectly poised to detect seismic wave vibrations.

The nose is about 1.5 cm (0.59 in) in diameter with its Eimer's organs distributed on 22 appendages. Eimer's organs were first described in the European mole in 1872 by German zoologist Theodor Eimer. Other mole species also possess Eimer's organs, though they are not as specialized or numerous as in the star-nosed mole. Because the star-nosed mole is functionally blind, the snout was long suspected to be used to detect electrical activity in prey animals, though little, if any, empirical support has been found for this hypothesis. The nasal star and dentition of this species appear to be primarily adapted to exploit extremely small prey. A report in the journal Nature gives this animal the title of fastest-eating mammal, taking as little as 120 milliseconds (average: 227 ms) to identify and consume individual food items. Its brain decides in approximately eight milliseconds if prey is edible or not. This speed is at the limit of the speed of neurons.

These moles are also able to smell underwater, accomplished by exhaling air bubbles onto objects or scent trails and then inhaling the bubbles to carry scents back through the nose.

== Ecology and behavior ==
The star-nosed mole lives in wet lowland areas and eats small invertebrates, such as aquatic insects (such as the larvae of caddisflies, midges, dragonflies, damselflies, crane flies, horseflies, predaceous diving beetles, and stoneflies), terrestrial insects, worms (such as earthworms, leeches, and other annelids), mollusks, and aquatic crustaceans, as well as small amphibians and small fish. Condylura cristata has also been found in dry meadows farther away from water. They have also been found in the Great Smoky Mountains as high as 1,676 m (5,499 ft). However, the star-nose mole does prefer wet, poorly drained areas and marshes. It is a good swimmer and can forage along the bottoms of streams and ponds. Like other moles, this animal digs shallow surface tunnels for foraging; often, these tunnels exit underwater. It is active day and night and remains active in winter when it has been observed tunneling through the snow and swimming in ice-covered streams. C. cristata is particularly adept at thermoregulation, maintaining a high body temperature in a wide range of external conditions relative to other Talpid moles. This explains its ability to thrive in cold aquatic environments. Little is known about the social behavior of the species, but it is suspected to be colonial.

This mole mates in late winter or early spring, and the female has one litter of typically four or five young in late spring or early summer. However, females are known to have a second litter if their first is unsuccessful. At birth, each offspring is about 5 cm (2 in) long, hairless, and weighs about 1.5 g (0.053 oz). Their eyes, ears, and star are all sealed, opening and becoming useful only about 14 days after birth. They become independent after about 30 days and are fully mature after 10 months. Predators include the red-tailed hawk, great horned owl, barn owl, screech owl, foxes, weasels, minks, various skunks and mustelids, and large fish such as the northern pike, as well as domestic cats.

== Snout comparison to visual organ ==
Vanderbilt University neuroscientist Kenneth Catania, who has studied star-nosed moles for 20 years, recently turned his research to the study of star-moles as a route to understanding general principles about how human brains process and represent sensory information. He called star-moles "a gold mine for discoveries about brains and behavior in general—and an unending source of surprises".

Comparing the mole's snout to vision, his research showed that whenever the mole touched potential food, it made a sudden movement to position the smallest rays, the twin rays number 11, over the object for repeated rapid touches. He reports: "The similarities with vision were striking. The star movements resembled saccadic eye movements—quick movements of the eyes from one focus point to another—in their speed and time-course. The two 11th rays are over-represented in the primary somatosensory cortex relative to their size, just as the small visual fovea in primates—a small region in the center of the eye that yields the sharpest vision—is over-represented in primary visual cortex." He notes that some bats also have an auditory fovea for processing important echolocation frequencies, suggesting that "evolution has repeatedly come to the same solution for constructing a high-acuity sensory system: subdivide the sensory surface into a large, lower-resolution periphery for scanning a wide range of stimuli, and a small, high-resolution area that can be focused on objects of importance".

The star-shaped nose is an organ found only on the star-nosed mole. Living as it does, in complete darkness, the star-nosed mole relies heavily on the mechanical information of its specialized nose to find and identify their invertebrate prey without using sight (since moles have small eyes and a tiny optic nerve). This organ is often recognized by its high sensitivity and reaction speed. In only eight milliseconds it can decide whether something is edible – in fact, this is one of the fastest responses to a stimulus in the animal kingdom and is the reason why the star-nosed mole was lately recognized in the Guinness Book of World Records as the world's fastest forager.

=== Anatomy and physiology ===
The star-nose is a highly specialized sensory-motor organ shaped by 22 fleshy finger-like appendages, or tendrils, that ring their nostrils and are in constant motion as the mole explores its environment. The star itself is 1 cm (0.39 in) across and thus has a diameter slightly smaller than a typical human fingertip. Nevertheless, it is much larger than the nose of other mole species, covering 0.92 cm^{2} (0.14 in^{2}) per touch compared to 0.11 cm^{2} (0.02 in^{2}) covered by the noses of other mole species. This structure is divided into a high resolution central fovea region (the central 11th pair of rays) and less sensitive peripheral areas. In this way, the star works as a "tactile eye" where the peripheral rays (1–10 on each side) study the surroundings with erratic saccade-like movements and direct the 11th ray to objects of interest, just like the primate's foveating eye.

Regardless of the anatomical position of the star as a distal (protruding or extending) portion of the nose, this is neither an olfactory structure nor an extra hand. The appendages do not contain muscles or bones and are not used to manipulate objects or capture prey. They are controlled by tendons by a complex series of muscles that are attached to the skull in order to perform a role that seems to be purely mechanical. For this purpose, the star also contains a remarkably specialized epidermis covered entirely by 25,000 small raised domes or papillae of approximately 30–50 μm (0.0012–0.0020 in) in diameter. These domes, termed Eimer's organs, are the only receptor organ type present in the star-nosed mole's star.

Eimer's organ is a sensory structure also found in nearly all of the approximately 30 species of mole, however none contains as many as in Condylura. This large amount of specialized receptors makes the star ultrasensitive – about 6 times more sensitive than the human hand, which contains about 17,000 receptors.

Each Eimer's organ is supplied by a number of primary afferents, thus the star is densely innervated. It is associated with a Merkel cell-neurite complex at the base of the cell column, a lamellated corpuscle in the dermis just below the column and a series of free nerve endings that originate from myelinated fibers in the dermis, run through the central column and end in a ring of terminal swellings just below the outer keratinized skin surface. All 25,000 Eimer's organs distributed along the surface of the star have this basic structure in all 22 appendages. Nevertheless, the fovea region (11th pair of rays), which is shorter in area, has a lower density of these organs – 900 Eimer's organs on its surface while some of the lateral rays have over 1500. This may sound contradictory with the fact that this region has higher resolution and an important role in foraging behavior. However, instead of having more sensory organs, this fovea region uses a different approach where the skin's surface may be more sensitive to mechanoreceptic input; it has more innervation density. Rays 1 through 9 each have about 4 fibers per Eimer's organ, while rays 10 and 11 have significantly higher innervation densities of 5.6 and 7.1 fibers per organ, respectively, revealing how the sensory periphery is differentially specialized across the star.

The myelinated fibers innervating the 11 rays were photographed and counted from an enlarged photomontage by Catania and colleagues. The total number of myelinated fibers for half of the star ranged from 53,050 to 93–94; hence the total fibers for the entire star vary from roughly 106,000 to 117,000. This means that tactile information from the environment is transmitted to the somatosensory neocortex rapidly. This would be insufficient without an adequate processing system, but in the star-nosed mole, the processing also occurs at a very high speed almost approaching the upper limit at which nervous systems are capable of functioning. The threshold at which the mole can decide whether or not something is edible is of 25 milliseconds: 12 milliseconds to the neurons in the mole's somatosensory cortex to respond to touch and other 5 milliseconds for motor commands to be conducted back to the star. In comparison, this whole process takes 600 milliseconds in humans.

The importance of the star-like nose in the mole's lifestyle is evidenced in the somatosensory representation of the nose. Electrophysiological experiments using electrodes placed on the cortex during stimulation of the body demonstrated that roughly 52% of the cortex is devoted to the nose. This means that more than half of the brain is dedicated to processing sensory information acquired by this organ, even when the nose itself is only roughly 10% of the mole's actual size. Thus, it may be concluded that the nose substitutes for the eyes, with the information from it being processed so as to produce a tactile map of the environment under the mole's nose. As other mammals, the somatosensory cortex of the star-nosed mole is somatotopically organized such that sensory information from adjacent parts of the nose is processed in adjacent regions of the somatosensory cortex. Therefore, the rays are also represented in the brain. The inferior most sensitive pair of rays (11th) had a larger representation on the somatosensory cortex, even when these are the shortest pair of appendages in the nose of the star-nosed mole.

Other important fact of the representation of the star in the cerebral cortex is that each hemisphere had clearly visible set of 11 stripes representing the contralateral star. In some favorable cases, a smaller third set of stripes was also apparent; opposite to other body structures that have a unique representation, with each half of the body represented in the opposite cerebral hemisphere. Thus, opposite to other species, the somatosensory representation of the tactile fovea is not correlated with anatomical parameters but rather is highly correlated with patterns of behavior. Recordings from active neurons in the somatosensory cortex show that most cells (97%) responded to light tactile stimulation with a mean latency of 11.6 milliseconds. Besides a fairly large proportion of these neurons (41%) were inhibited by stimulation of proximate Eimer's organs outside their excitatory receptive field. Consequently, the ability of the star to rapidly determine location and identity of objects is enhanced by small receptive fields and its associated collateral inhibition system that constrains cortical neurons with short latency responses.

==== Sensitivity to mechanical stimuli ====
In 1996, Vanderbilt PhD candidate Paul Marasco determined that the threshold by which the star-like structure senses the mechanical stimuli depends on which type of the Eimer's organ was excited. He characterized three main classes of Eimer's receptors, including one of slow adaptation (Tonic receptor) and two of rapid adaptation (Phasic receptor). The tonic receptor has a response similar to that of a Merkel cell-neurite complex. It has free terminals and is therefore able to detect pressure and texture with a high sensitivity and at a Random Sustained Discharge. The rapid adapting responses include a Pacinian-like response based on an (on-off) response caused by pressure and mechanical vibrations with maximum sensitivity to stimuli at a frequency of 250 Hz. The differences between both rapid responses rely on the fact that one of them only has a response during the compression phase.

==== Frequency sensitivity ====
Among the receptors described, Marasco identified that there were receptors relatively unresponsive to compressive stimuli but were acutely responsive to any kind of stimulus that brushed or slid across the surface of the nose (Stimuli applied with large displacements and high velocity). In contrast, there were other receptors that responded robustly to small magnitude compression of any kind but were not responsive to sweeping stimuli. The receptors that were sensitive to sweeping were maximally activated across a broad range of frequencies from 5–150 Hz at large displacements ranging from 85 to 485 μm. Conversely, the receptors that respond to compressive stimuli showed a narrow peak of maximal activity at 250–300 Hz with displacements from 10 to 28 μm.

==== Directional sensitivity ====
Based on the circular organization of the nerve endings and its innervation pattern in Eimer's organs, Marasco proposed by mapping experiments that nearly all receptors in the star-nosed mole have a preference for a particular direction of applied stimuli. Thus, while one receptor elicits a strong response if compressed in one direction, it may stay "silent" when compressed in another one.

==== Velocity sensitivity ====
Examination of the threshold of velocity at which the receptors responded identified that the minimum velocity of cell response was 46 mm/s, corresponding to the approximate speed of the nose during foraging behavior.

==== Transduction of the mechanical signal ====
Taking into account that Eimer's organ senses mechanical deformation, its mechanism of transduction can be explained in a few steps:

1. Stimuli cause depolarization of the receptor membrane, resulting in a receptor potential and therefore a current towards the node of Ranvier.
2. If the receptor potential is maintained and the generated current is enough to reach the node of Ranvier, then the threshold is reached to produce an action potential.
3. When the action potential is produced, ionic channels are activated so that the mechanical impulse is transduced into electrical.
4. This signal is carried along the axon until it reaches the SNC where the information is processed.

Although these summarized steps of mechanical transduction give a hint of how the star-nosed mole converts mechanical information into potential actions, the entire mechanism of transduction behind this intricate mechanoreceptor is still unknown and further studies are required.

=== Behavior ===
Despite the poorly developed eyes, star-nosed moles have an intricate system to detect prey and understand their environment. During exploration, the mole's star-like appendage produces brief touches which compress Eimer's organ against objects or substrate. When foraging, moles search in random patterns of touches lasting 20–30 milliseconds. Catania and colleagues demonstrated that the tactile organ of the star-nosed mole is preferentially innervated by putative light touch fibers. When the outer appendages of the star come into slight contact with a potential food source, the nose is quickly shifted so that one or more touches are made with the fovea (the two lower appendages; 11th pair) to explore objects of interest in more detail – especially potential prey. This foraging behavior is exceptionally fast, such that the mole may touch between 10 and 15 separate areas of the ground every second. It can locate and consume 8 separate prey items in less than 2 seconds and begin searching again for more prey in as little as 120 ms, although the average time is 227 ms.

The sequence described constitutes handling time. In studies made by high-speed video, the mole always foveated to the 11th appendage to explore a food item. The use of the 11th appendage of the tactile fovea is surprisingly similar to the manner in which human eyes explore details of a visual scene.

This star-like nose also enables the mole to smell underwater, something which was previously thought impossible in mammals, which requires the inspiration of air during olfaction to convey odorants to the olfactory epithelium. Although the star-like structure is not a chemoreceptor itself, it helps the star-nosed mole blow between 8 and 12 small air bubbles per second, each 0.06 to 0.1 mm in size, onto objects or scent trails. These bubbles are then drawn back into the nostrils, so that odorant molecules in the air bubbles are wafted over the olfactory receptors. The speed of the bubbles is compared to other mole's speed of sniffing. Scientists found that the bubbles are being blown towards targets such as food. Before the star-nosed mole, scientists did not believe that mammals could smell underwater, let alone smell by blowing bubbles.

In 1993, Edwin Gould and colleagues proposed that the star-like proboscis had electroreceptors and that the mole was therefore able to sense the electrical field of its prey prior to mechanical inspection by its appendages. Through behavioral experiments, they demonstrated that moles preferred an artificial worm with the simulated electrical field of a live earthworm to an identical arrangement without the electrical field. They suggested, therefore, that the nerve endings in the star's tentacles are indeed electroreceptors and that the moles move them around constantly to sample the strength of the electromagnetic field at different locations as they search for prey. However, the hypothesis remains unexplained physiologically and has not yet been accepted by the scientific community. Instead, the hypothesis proposed by Catania, in which the function of the appendage is purely tactile, seems to be more feasible and is the one currently accepted.

=== Evolution ===
The development of the star-like appendages suggests precursors with proto-appendages on an ancestor's snout, which became elevated over successive generations. Although this theory lacks fossil evidence or supporting comparative data, nearly all extant moles have sheets of the Eimer's organ making up the epidermis of their snout around the nares. Also, recent studies of Catania and colleagues identified one North American species (Scapanus townsendii) with a set of proto-appendages extending caudally on the snout which exhibit a striking resemblance to the embryonic stages of the star-nosed mole, although S. townsendii has only eight subdivisions on its face, rather than the 22 appendages found on the star-nosed mole. Such change is of common occurrence in evolution and is explained by the advantage of efficiently adding modules to the body plan without need to reinvent the regulatory elements which produce each module. Thus, although the star is unique in its shape and size, it seems feasible that the structure is based on a more ancestral bauplan as it comprises similarities found in a wide range of other moles and also in the molecular structure of other mammals.

The picture which emerges suggests that the star-nosed mole is an extreme in mammalian evolution, having perhaps the most sensitive mechano-sensory system to be found among mammals. There are two evolutionary theories concerning the star-like nose. One proposes the development of the structure of the star as a consequence of the selective pressure of the star-nosed mole's wetland habitat. Wetlands have a dense population of small insects, so exploiting this resource requires a higher resolution sensory surface than that of other moles. Thus, a shift to the wetland environment may have provided a selective advantage for a more elaborate sensory structure. Furthermore, in wild caught moles of many species, the Eimer's organs show obvious signs of wear and abrasion. It appears that constant and repeated contact with the soil damages the sensory organs, which have a thin keratinized epidermis. Star-nosed moles are the only species which live in the moist, muddy soil of wetlands where the less abrasive environment has allowed the delicate star-shaped structure to evolve.

The second theory, that of prey profitability, explains the foraging speed of the star-nosed mole. Prey profitability (i.e. energy gained divided by prey handling time) is an essential variable for estimating the optimal diet. When handling time approaches zero, profitability increases dramatically. Due to the small invertebrate prey available in the wetlands, the star-nosed mole has developed handling times as short as 120 ms. The dazzling speed with which it forages therefore counterbalances the low nutritional value of each individual piece of food and maximizes the time available for finding more. Further, the proximity of the star-shaped nose to the mouth greatly reduces the handling time required before food can be ingested and is a major factor in how the star-nosed mole can find and eat food so quickly.

=== Current applications in engineering ===
The study of highly specialized systems often allows better insight into more generalized ones. The mole's striking, star-like structure may reflect a general trend in its "less remarkable" relatives, including humans. Little is known today about the molecular mechanisms of tactile transduction in mammals. As the Drosophila fly is to genetics, or the squid giant axon is to neurobiology, the star-nosed mole may be the model organism for tactile transduction. The proper understanding of its saccade-like system and associated transduction may lead in the future to the development of new types of neural prostheses. Furthermore, the outstanding speed and precision at which the mole performs may provide insights into the structural design of intelligent machines as an artificial response to the remarkable sensory ability of the star-nosed mole.

== Snout as related to optimal foraging theory ==
According to optimal foraging theory, organisms forage in such a way as to maximize their net energy intake per unit time. In other words, they behave in such a way as to find, capture and consume food containing the most calories while expending the least amount of time possible in doing so. With extremely short handling times for eating very small prey, star-nosed moles can profitably consume foods that are not worth the time or effort of slower animals, and having a food category to themselves is a big advantage. Furthermore, just behind the 11th ray of the star, the star-nosed mole has modified front teeth that form the equivalent of a pair of tweezers. High-speed video shows these specialized teeth are used to pluck tiny prey from the ground. As Catania reports, "It is also clear from the behavior that the teeth and the star act as an integrated unit – the 11th rays, located directly in front on the teeth, spread apart as the teeth move forward to grasp small food. Thus, tweezer-like teeth and the exquisitely sensitive star likely evolved together as a means to better find and handle small prey quickly...it appears that the ability to rapidly detect and consume small prey was the major selective advantage that drove the evolution of the star."
