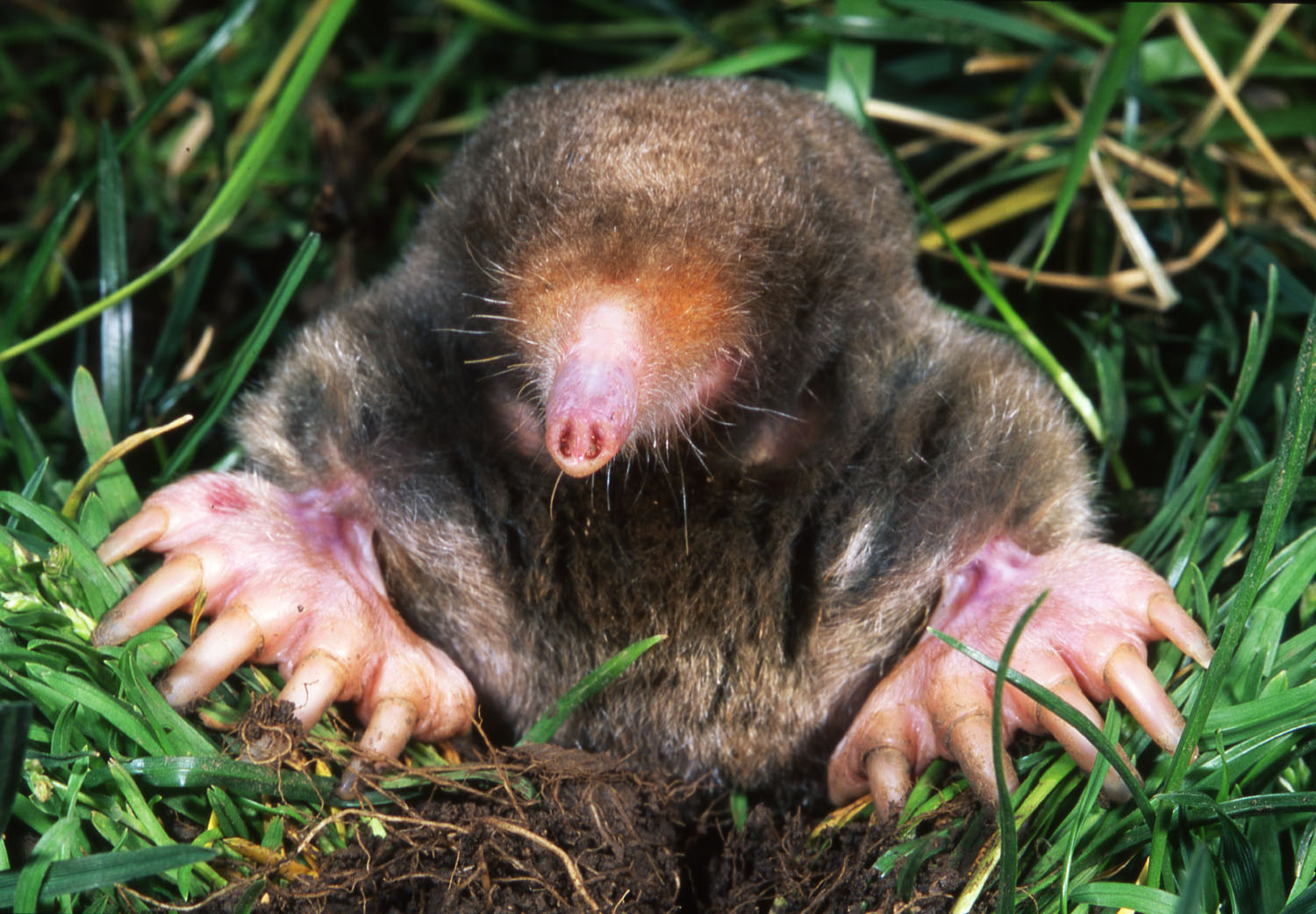

Conservation status
- Least Concern (IUCN 3.1)

Scientific classification
- Kingdom: Animalia
- Phylum: Chordata
- Class: Mammalia
- Order: Eulipotyphla
- Family: Talpidae
- Genus: Scalopus; É. Geoffroy, 1803
- Species: S. aquaticus

Binomial name
- Scalopus aquaticus (Linnaeus, 1758)
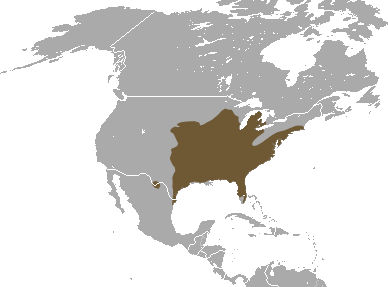
- Eastern mole range

Synonyms
- Sorex aquaticus Linnaeus, 1758

= Eastern mole =

Species of mammal

The eastern mole or common mole (Scalopus aquaticus) is a medium-sized North American mole. It is the only species in the genus Scalopus. It is found in forested and open areas with moist sandy soils in northern Mexico, the eastern United States and the southwestern corner of Ontario in Canada.

== Description ==
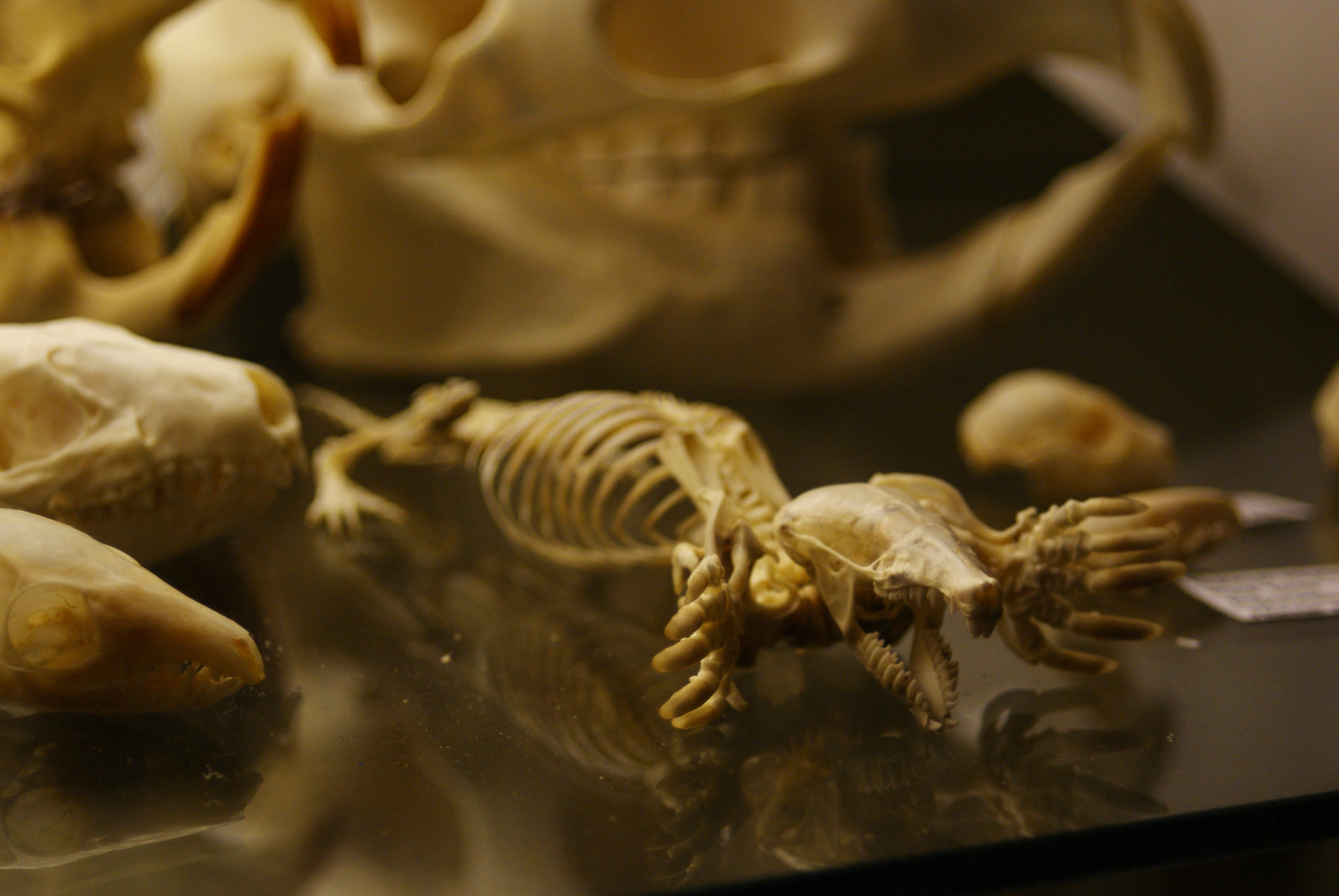
Skeleton of an Eastern mole

The eastern mole has grey-brown fur with silver-grey underparts, a pointed nose and a short tail. It is about 16 centimetres (6.3 in) in length including a 3 centimetres (1.2 in) long tail and weighs about 75 grams (2.6 oz). Its front paws are broad and spade-shaped, specialized for digging. It has 36 teeth. Its eyes are covered by fur and its ears are not visible.

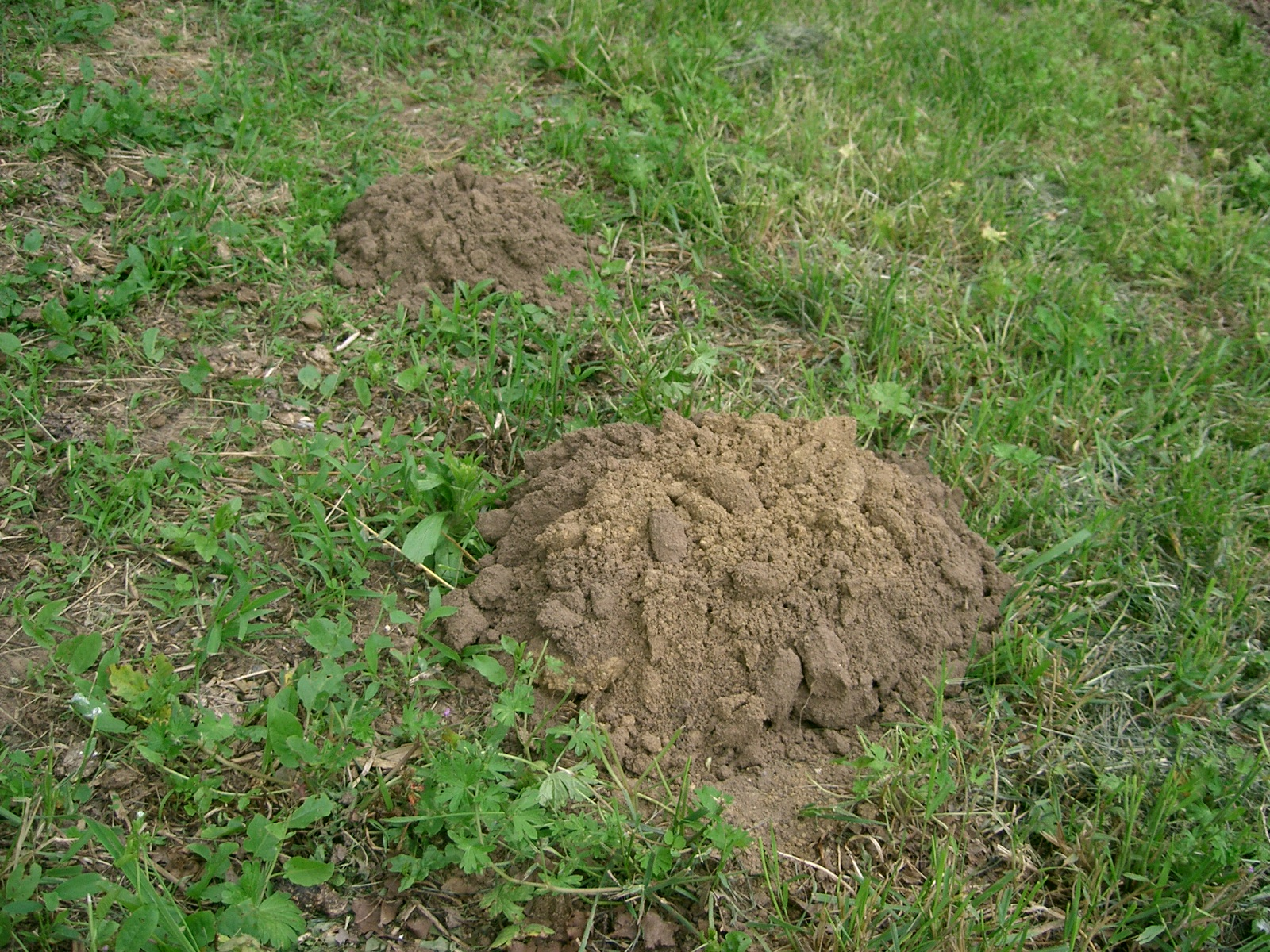
Molehill

The eastern mole spends most of its time underground, foraging in shallow burrows. It feeds on earthworms, grubs, beetles, insect larvae, and plant matter. The mole is mainly solitary except during mating in early spring. The female has a litter of two to five young in a deep burrow.

In Canada, the eastern mole is limited to about 2,600 acres in southern Ontario, primarily in Essex and Kent Counties. It prefers soft, sandy, or muddy soils and avoids clay or gravel, making its suitable habitat limited.

== Subspecies ==
A majority of the moles throughout their range are S. a. aquaticus. All the other subspecies exist in small pocket ranges.

Subspecies of Scalopus aquaticus
Subspecies	Name	Range
S. a. aquaticus	Eastern mole	Throughout the mainland United States and Canada
S. a. anastasae	Anastasia Island mole	Anastasia Island, a small close-to-shore island off of St. Augustine, Florida.
S. a. bassi	Englewood mole	The area within and surrounding Englewood, Florida.
S. a. texanus	Presidia mole	The Rio Grande near and between the Cibolo and Alamito Creeks.

== Predation ==
Occasionally, when eastern moles do exit their burrows, they may be spotted and eaten by red foxes, gray foxes, coyotes, domestic dogs, domestic cats, raccoons, red-tailed hawks, red-shouldered hawks, broad-winged hawks, eastern screech-owls, barred owls, and barn owls.

== See also ==
- Rockport virus, a virus first discovered in eastern moles
