= Lists of mammals by region =

Lists of mammals by region cover mammals found in different parts of the world. They are organized by continent, region, and country, and in some places by sub-national region. Most are full species lists, while those for Australia and the Caribbean have links to more specific species lists.

== Africa ==
=== Eastern Africa ===
- Burundi
- Comoros
- Djibouti
- Eritrea
- Ethiopia
- Kenya
- Madagascar
- Malawi
- Mauritius
- Mayotte (FR)
- Mozambique
- Réunion (FR)
- Rwanda
- Seychelles
- Somalia
- South Sudan
- Tanzania
  - Zanzibar
- Uganda
- Zambia
- Zimbabwe

=== Central Africa ===
- Angola
- Cameroon
- Central African Republic
- Chad
- Republic of the Congo
- Democratic Republic of the Congo
- Equatorial Guinea
- Gabon
- São Tomé and Príncipe

=== Northern Africa ===
- Algeria
- Egypt
- Libya
- Morocco
- Sudan
- Tunisia
- Western Sahara
- Canary Islands (ES)
- Ceuta (ES)
- Melilla (ES)
- Madeira (PT)

=== Southern Africa ===
- Botswana
- Eswatini
- Lesotho
- Namibia
- South Africa

=== Western Africa ===
- Benin
- Burkina Faso
- Cape Verde
- The Gambia
- Ghana
- Guinea
- Guinea-Bissau
- Ivory Coast
- Liberia
- Mali
- Mauritania
- Niger
- Nigeria
- Saint Helena (UK)
  - Ascension Island
  - Tristan da Cunha
    - Inaccessible Island
    - Nightingale Islands
    - Gough
- Senegal
- Sierra Leone
- Togo

== Americas ==
=== Caribbean ===
- Anguilla (UK)
- Antigua and Barbuda
- Aruba (NL)
- Bahamas
- Barbados
- Cayman Islands (UK)
- Cuba
- Dominica
- Dominican Republic
- Grenada
- Guadeloupe (FR)
- Haiti
- Jamaica
- Martinique (FR)
- Montserrat (UK)
- Netherlands Antilles (NL)
- Puerto Rico (US)
- Saint-Barthélemy (FR)
- Saint Kitts and Nevis
- Saint Lucia
- Saint Martin (FR)
- Sint Maarten (NL)
- Saint Vincent and the Grenadines
- Trinidad and Tobago
- Turks and Caicos Islands (UK)
- British Virgin Islands (UK)
- United States Virgin Islands (US)

=== Central America ===
- Belize
- Costa Rica
- El Salvador
- Guatemala
- Honduras
- Nicaragua
- Panama

=== North America ===
- Mexico
- Bermuda (UK)
- Canada
  - Alberta
  - British Columbia
  - Manitoba
  - Newfoundland and Labrador
  - Northwest Territories
  - Nova Scotia
  - Nunavut
  - Ontario
  - New Brunswick
  - Prince Edward Island
  - Quebec
  - Saskatchewan
  - Yukon
- Greenland (DK)
- Saint Pierre and Miquelon (FR)
- United States of America
  - New England
    - Connecticut
    - Maine
    - Massachusetts
    - New Hampshire
    - Rhode Island
    - Vermont
  - Alabama
  - Alaska
  - Arizona
  - Arkansas
  - California
  - Colorado
  - Delaware
  - Florida
  - Georgia
  - Idaho
  - Illinois
  - Indiana
  - Iowa
  - Kansas
  - Kentucky
  - Louisiana
  - Maryland
  - Michigan
  - Minnesota
  - Mississippi
  - Missouri
  - Montana
  - Nebraska
  - Nevada
  - New Jersey
  - New Mexico
  - New York
  - North Carolina
  - North Dakota
  - Ohio
  - Oklahoma
  - Oregon
  - Pennsylvania
  - South Carolina
  - South Dakota
  - Tennessee
  - Texas
  - Utah
  - Virginia
  - Washington
  - West Virginia
  - Wisconsin
  - Wyoming

=== South America ===
- Argentina
- Bolivia
- Brazil
  - Fernando de Noronha
- Chile
  - Juan Fernández Islands
- Colombia
- Ecuador
  - Galápagos Islands
- Falkland Islands (UK)
- French Guiana (FR)
- Guyana
- Paraguay
- Peru
- Suriname
- Uruguay
- Venezuela

== Asia ==
=== Central Asia ===
- Kazakhstan
- Kyrgyzstan
- Tajikistan
- Turkmenistan
- Uzbekistan

=== Eastern Asia ===
- China
  - Tibet
  - Manchuria
  - Hong Kong
  - Macau
- Japan
  - Bonin Islands
  - Ryukyu Islands
- Korea
  - North Korea
  - South Korea
- Taiwan
- Mongolia

=== Southeastern Asia ===
- Brunei
- Cambodia
- East Timor
- Indonesia
  - Borneo
  - Java
  - Kalimantan
  - Lesser Sunda Islands
  - Maluku Islands
  - Sulawesi
  - Sumatra
  - West Timor
- Laos
- Malaysia
  - Malay Peninsula
  - Malaysian Borneo
- Myanmar
- Philippines
  - Luzon
  - Mindanao
  - Mindoro
  - Negros
  - Palawan
  - Panay
  - Samar
- Singapore
- South China Sea Islands
  - Paracel Islands (CN)
  - Pratas Island (TW)
  - Spratly Islands (CN, MY, PH, TW, VN)
- Thailand
- Vietnam

=== Southern Asia ===
- Afghanistan
- Bangladesh
- Bhutan
- Chagos Archipelago (UK)
- Cocos (Keeling) Islands (AU)
- India
  - Andaman and Nicobar Islands
  - Chhattisgarh
  - Telangana
- Maldives
- Nepal
- Pakistan
- Sri Lanka

=== Western Asia ===
- Armenia
- Azerbaijan
- Bahrain
- Georgia
- Iran
- Iraq
- Israel
- Jordan
- Kuwait
- Lebanon
- Oman
- Palestine
- Qatar
- Saudi Arabia
- Syria
- Turkey
- Cyprus
- United Arab Emirates
- Yemen

== Europe ==
=== Central Europe ===
- Austria
- Czech Republic
- Germany
- Hungary
- Liechtenstein
- Poland
- Slovakia
- Switzerland

=== Eastern Europe ===
- Belarus
- Russia
- Ukraine

=== Northern Europe ===
- Denmark
  - Faroe Islands
- Estonia
- Finland
  - Åland Islands
- Iceland
- Ireland
- Latvia
- Lithuania
- Norway
  - Jan Mayen
  - Svalbard
- Sweden
- United Kingdom
  - Great Britain
    - Scotland
    - England
    - Wales
    - Cornwall
  - Isle of Man
  - Channel Islands
    - Guernsey
    - Jersey

=== Southern Europe ===
- Albania
- Andorra
- Bosnia and Herzegovina
- Bulgaria
- Corsica (FR)
- Croatia
- Gibraltar (UK)
- Greece
  - Crete
- Italy
  - Sardinia
  - Sicily
- Malta
- Moldova
- Monaco
- Montenegro
- North Macedonia
- Portugal
  - Azores
- Romania
- San Marino
- Serbia
- Slovenia
- Spain
  - Basque Country
  - Balearic Islands
- Vatican City

=== Western Europe ===
- Belgium
- France
  - Brittany
- Luxembourg
- Netherlands

== Oceania and Antarctica ==
=== Australia & New Zealand ===
- Australia
  - Australian Capital Territory
  - Coral Sea Islands
  - Queensland
  - New South Wales
  - Northern Territory
  - South Australia
  - Tasmania
  - Victoria
  - Western Australia
  - Norfolk Island
  - Ashmore Reef
  - Christmas Island
- New Zealand
  - Chatham Islands
  - Kermadec Islands
  - North Island
  - South Island

=== Melanesia ===
- Fiji
- Irian Jaya (ID)
- New Caledonia (FR)
- Northern Torres Strait islands (AU)
- East Timor
- Papua New Guinea
  - Bismarck Archipelago
- Solomon Islands
- Vanuatu

=== Micronesia ===
- Guam (US)
- Kiribati
- Marshall Islands
- Federated States of Micronesia
- Nauru
- Northern Mariana Islands (US)
- Palau
- Palmyra Atoll (US)

=== Polynesia ===
- American Samoa (US)
- Cook Islands (NZ)
- Easter Island (CL)
- French Polynesia (FR)
- Hawaii (US)
- Johnston Atoll (US)
- Midway Islands (US)
- Niue (NZ)
- Pitcairn (UK)
- Samoa
- Tokelau (NZ)
- Tonga
- Tuvalu
- Wake Island (US)
- Wallis and Futuna (FR)

=== Antarctica & Southern Ocean islands ===
- Antarctica
- Bouvet Island (NO)
- British Antarctic Territory (UK)
  - South Georgia and the South Sandwich Islands
  - South Orkney Islands
  - South Shetland Islands
- French Southern Territories (FR)
  - Amsterdam Island
  - Crozet Islands
  - Kerguelen Islands
  - Saint Paul Island
- Heard and McDonald Islands (AU)
- Macquarie Island (AU)
- Prince Edward Islands (S. Africa)

== See also ==
- List of mammals
- Lists of mammals by population
- List of mammalogists
