= List of mammals of Bouvet Island =

This is a list of the mammal species recorded in Bouvet Island. There are 12 mammal species in and around Bouvet Island, of which none are believed to be threatened.

The following tags are used to highlight each species' conservation status as assessed by the International Union for Conservation of Nature:

EX	Extinct	No reasonable doubt that the last individual has died.
EW	Extinct in the wild	Known only to survive in captivity or as a naturalized populations well outside its previous range.
CR	Critically endangered	The species is in imminent risk of extinction in the wild.
EN	Endangered	The species is facing an extremely high risk of extinction in the wild.
VU	Vulnerable	The species is facing a high risk of extinction in the wild.
NT	Near threatened	The species does not meet any of the criteria that would categorise it as risking extinction but it is likely to do so in the future.
LC	Least concern	There are no current identifiable risks to the species.
DD	Data deficient	There is inadequate information to make an assessment of the risks to this species.

== Order: Cetacea (whales) ==
The order Cetacea includes whales, dolphins and porpoises. They are the mammals most fully adapted to aquatic life with a spindle-shaped nearly hairless body, protected by a thick layer of blubber, and forelimbs and tail modified to provide propulsion underwater.

- Suborder: Mysticeti
  - Family: Balaenidae
    - Genus: Eubalaena
      - Southern right whale, Eubalaena australis LC^{IUCN}
  - Family: Balaenopteridae
    - Genus: Balaenoptera
      - Fin whale, B. physalus VU^{IUCN}
    - Genus: Megaptera
      - Humpback whale, M. novaeangliae LC^{IUCN}
- Suborder: Odontoceti
  - Superfamily: Platanistoidea
    - Family: Delphinidae (marine dolphins)
      - Genus: Lissodelphis
        - Southern right whale dolphin, Lissodelphis peronii LC^{IUCN}
      - Genus: Globicephala
        - Long-finned pilot whale, G. melas LC^{IUCN}
      - Genus: Lagenorhynchus
        - Hourglass dolphin, L. cruciger LC^{IUCN}

== Order: Carnivora (carnivorans) ==
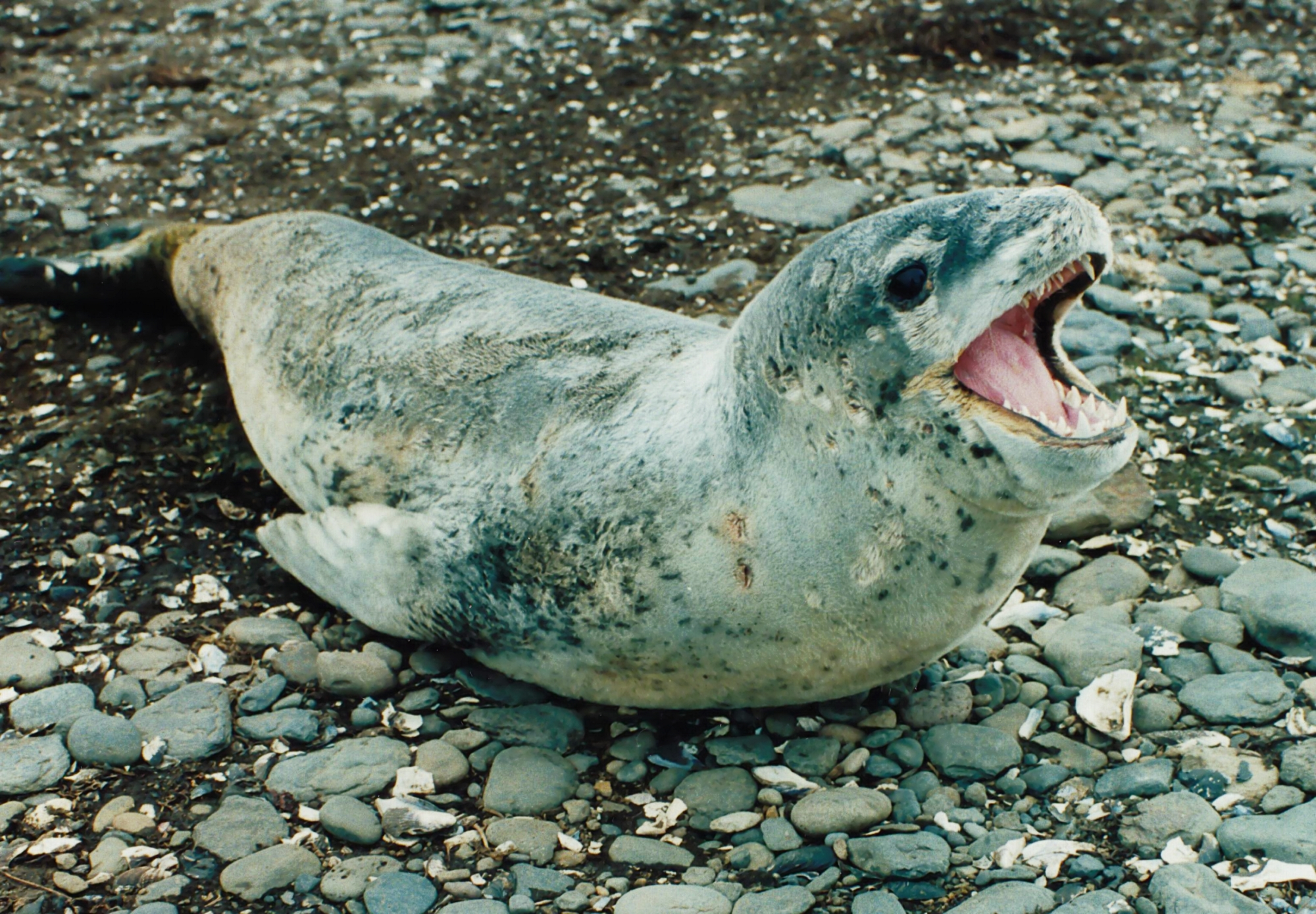
Leopard seal

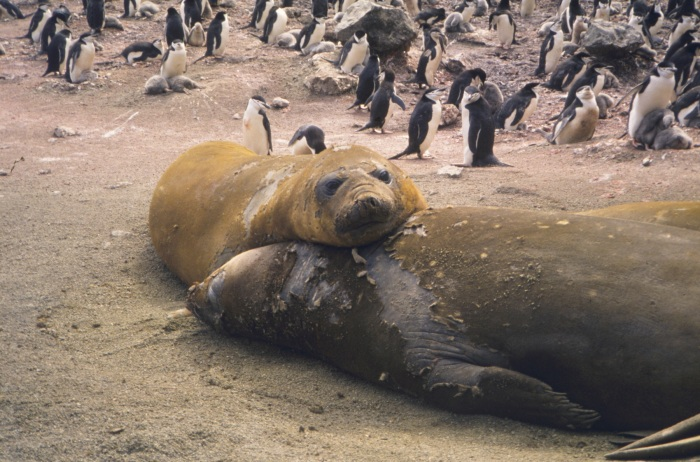
Southern elephant seal

There are over 260 species of carnivorans, the majority of which feed primarily on meat. They have a characteristic skull shape and dentition.

- Suborder: Caniformia
  - Family: Otariidae (eared seals, sealions)
    - Genus: Arctocephalus
      - Antarctic fur seal, Arctocephalus gazella LC^{IUCN}
      - Subantarctic fur seal, A. tropicalis LC^{IUCN}
  - Family: Phocidae (earless seals)
    - Genus: Hydrurga
      - Leopard seal, Hydrurga leptonyx LC^{IUCN}
    - Genus: Leptonychotes
      - Weddell seal, Leptonychotes weddellii LC^{IUCN}
    - Genus: Lobodon
      - Crabeater seal, Lobodon carcinophagus LC^{IUCN}
    - Genus: Mirounga
      - Southern elephant seal, Mirounga leonina LC^{IUCN}

== See also ==
- List of chordate orders
- Lists of mammals by region
- List of prehistoric mammals
- Mammal classification
- List of mammals described in the 2000s
