= List of mammals of New Brunswick =

Mammals in Canadian province

New Brunswick is a Maritime province of Canada, bordered by Quebec to the north, Nova Scotia to the east, the Gulf of St. Lawrence to the northeast, the Bay of Fundy to the southeast, and the US state of Maine to the west. Lying within the Appalachian Mountain range, the province is largely covered by temperate broadleaf and mixed forests, with the northern part of the province also containing boreal forest. The coastlines of the province contain a large marine environment. These different ecosystems contribute to the diversity of birds in the province. This is a list of all mammalian species from New Brunswick.

== Rodents (Rodentia) ==
- North American beaver (Castor canadensis)
- American red squirrel (Tamiasciurus hudsonicus)
- Northern flying squirrel (Glaucomys sabrinus)
- Eastern chipmunk (Tamias striatus)
- Least chipmunk (Tamias minimus)
- Groundhog (Marmota monax)
- Eastern meadow vole (Microtus pennsylvanicus)
- Southern red-backed vole (Clethrionomys gapperi)
- Rock vole (Microtus chrotorrhinus)
- Meadow jumping mouse (Zapus hudsonius)
- Woodland jumping mouse (Napaeozapus insignis)
- Southern bog lemming (Synaptomys cooperi)
- Northern bog lemming (Synaptomys borealis)
- North American porcupine (Erethizon dorsatum)

== Lagomorphs (Lagomorpha) ==
- Snowshoe hare (Lepus americanus)

== True insectivores (Eulipotyphla) ==
- Smoky shrew (Sorex fumeus)

== Bats (Chiroptera) ==
- Hoary bat (Lasiurus cinerus)
- Eastern red bat (Lasiurus borealis)
- Northern long-eared bat (Myotis septentrionalis)

== Flesh-eating mammals (Carnivora) ==
=== Felines (Felidae) ===
- Canada lynx (Lynx canadensis)
- Bobcat (Lynx rufus)
- Eastern cougar (Puma concolor couguar)

=== Bears (Ursidae) ===
- American black bear (Ursus americanus)

=== Canines (Canidae) ===
- Wolf (Canis lupus) extirpated, but sightings continue
- Eastern coyote (Canis latrans var.)

=== Mustelids (Mustelidae) ===
- North American river otter (Lontra canadensis)
- Pine marten (Martes americana)
- Fisher (Pekania pennanti)

=== True seals (Phocidae) ===
- Harbor seal (Phoca vitulina)

=== Walruses (Odobenidae) ===
- Atlantic walrus (Odobenus rosmarus rosmarus) Extirpated

== Even-toed ungulates (Artiodactyla) ==
- Boreal woodland caribou (Rangifer tarandus caribou) extirpated
- Eastern moose (Alces alces americana)
- White-tailed deer (Odocoileus virginianus)

== See also ==
- List of mammals
- Lists of mammals by region
- List of birds of New Brunswick
