= List of mammals of Nauru =

This is a list of the mammal species recorded in Nauru. All five of the wild mammal species in Nauru are marine mammals of the order Cetacea.

None of the five species have been assessed by the International Union for Conservation of Nature, as there is inadequate information to make an assessment of the risks to these species, so all are marked DD (data deficient).

== Order: Cetacea (whales) ==
The order Cetacea includes whales, dolphins and porpoises. They are the mammals most fully adapted to aquatic life with a spindle-shaped nearly hairless body, protected by a thick layer of blubber, and forelimbs and tail modified to provide propulsion underwater.

- Suborder: Odontoceti
  - Superfamily: Platanistoidea
    - Family: Ziphidae
      - Subfamily: Hyperoodontinae
        - Genus: Mesoplodon
          - Blainville's beaked whale, Mesoplodon densirostris DD
          - Ginkgo-toothed beaked whale, Mesoplodon ginkgodens DD
    - Family: Delphinidae (marine dolphins)
      - Genus: Lagenodelphis
        - Fraser's dolphin, Lagenodelphis hosei DD
      - Genus: Feresa
        - Pygmy killer whale, Feresa attenuata DD
      - Genus: Orcinus
        - Orca, Orcinus orca DD

== See also ==
- List of chordate orders
- Lists of mammals by region
- List of prehistoric mammals
- Mammal classification
- List of mammals described in the 2000s
