= List of mammals of Ascension Island =

This is a list of the mammal species recorded on and around Ascension Island. Ascension Island has two native mammal species, both of which are beaked whales in the genus Mesoplodon. Neither is thought to be at risk, but there is insufficient data collected on them to allow an assessment to be made.

The following tags are used to highlight each species' conservation status as assessed by the International Union for Conservation of Nature:

DD	Data deficient	There is inadequate information to make an assessment of the risks to this species.

== Order: Cetacea (whales) ==
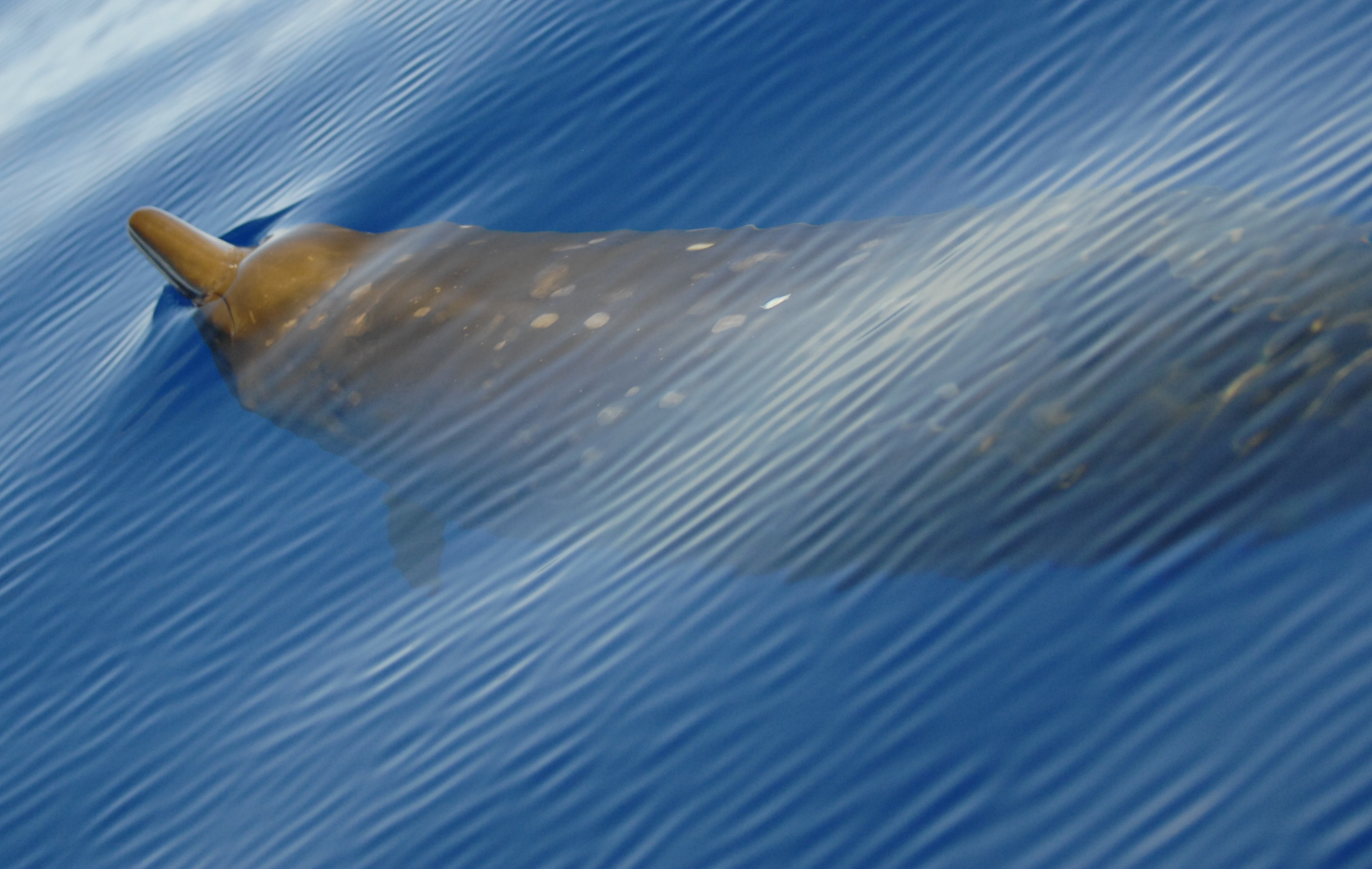
Blainville's beaked whale

The order Cetacea includes whales, dolphins and porpoises. They are the mammals most fully adapted to aquatic life with a spindle-shaped nearly hairless body, protected by a thick layer of blubber, and forelimbs and tail modified to provide propulsion underwater.

- Suborder: Odontoceti
  - Superfamily: Platanistoidea
    - Family: Ziphidae
      - Subfamily: Hyperoodontinae
        - Genus: Mesoplodon
          - Blainville's beaked whale, M. densirostris DD
          - Gervais' beaked whale, M. europaeus DD

== See also ==
- List of chordate orders
- Lists of mammals by region
- List of prehistoric mammals
- Mammal classification
- List of mammals described in the 2000s
