= List of mammals of Tuvalu =

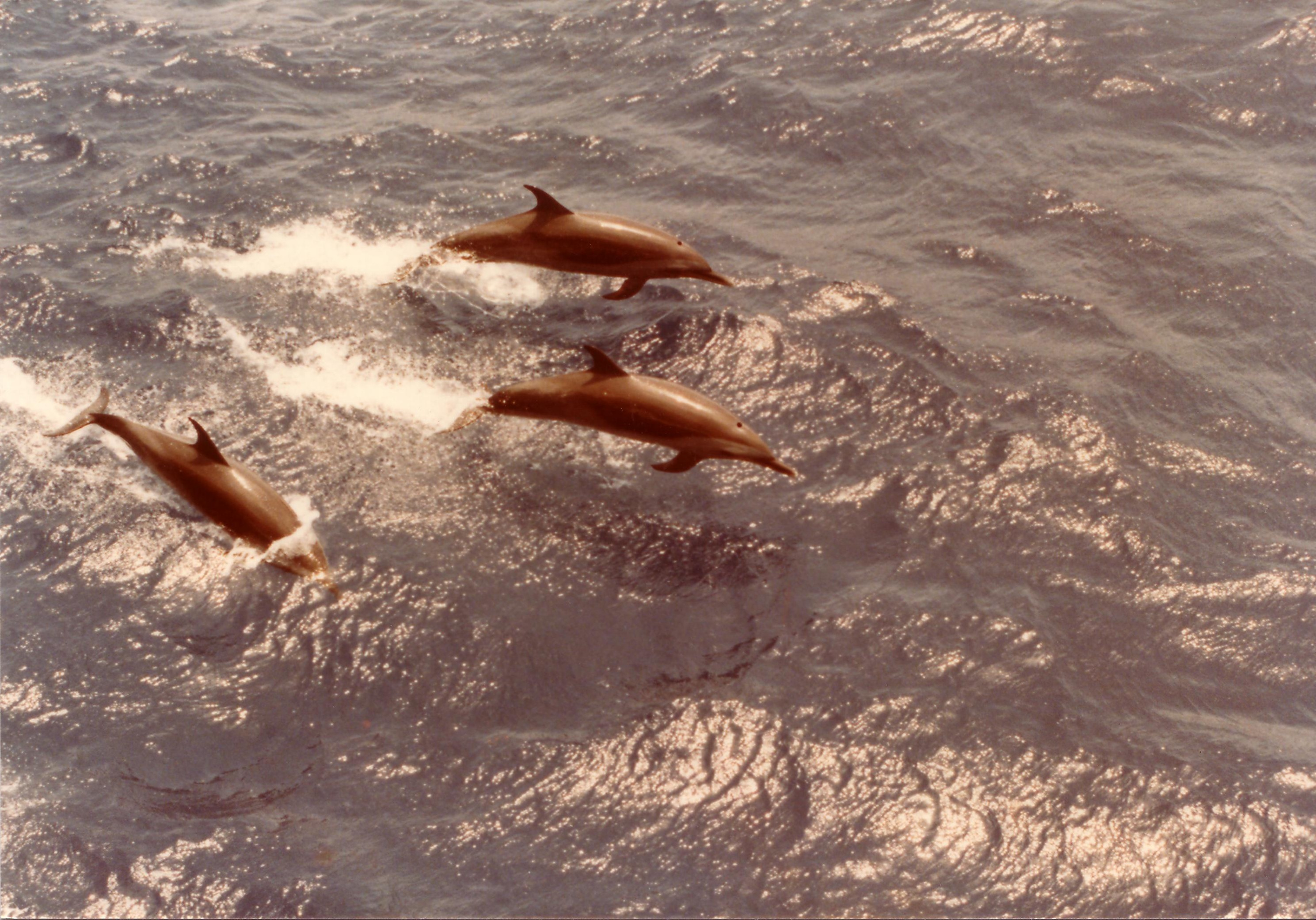
Pantropical spotted dolphins porpoising

This is a list of the mammal species recorded in Tuvalu. There are three mammal species in Tuvalu identified in the IUCN Red List, all of which are marine mammals of the order Cetacea: ginkgo-toothed beaked whale (Mesoplodon ginkgodens), pygmy killer whale (Feresa attenuata), and pantropical spotted dolphin (Stenella attenuata).

The literature review by Miller (2006) found four additional cetaceans reported: orca or killer whale (Orcinus orca), spinner dolphin (Stenella longirostris), bottlenose dolphin (Tursiops truncatus), and sperm whale (Physeter macrocephalus). The pantropical spotted dolphin (Stenella attenuata) is found in the lists of both Miller and the IUCN.

A revision of the list of cetaceans reported in the ocean surrounding Tuvalu was carried out by Miller (2009), who listed a "minke-like" whale (Balaenoptera species) and a diminutive sperm whale (Kogia species).

In 2010 a research voyage was conducted within the exclusive economic zones (EEZs) of Kiribati and Tuvalu. The survey confirmed the presence of seven species of cetaceans: sperm whale, killer whale, Bryde's whale (Balaenoptera brydei), short-finned pilot whale (Globicephala macrorhynchus), false killer whale (Pseudorca crassidens), spinner dolphin, and striped dolphin (Stenella coeruleoalba).

The Pacific Ocean surrounding Tuvalu is within the range of these cetaceans although sightings of some of these species may be infrequent.

The following tags are used to highlight each species' conservation status as assessed by the International Union for Conservation of Nature:

DD	Data deficient	There is inadequate information to make an assessment of the risks to this species.

== Order: Cetacea (whales) ==
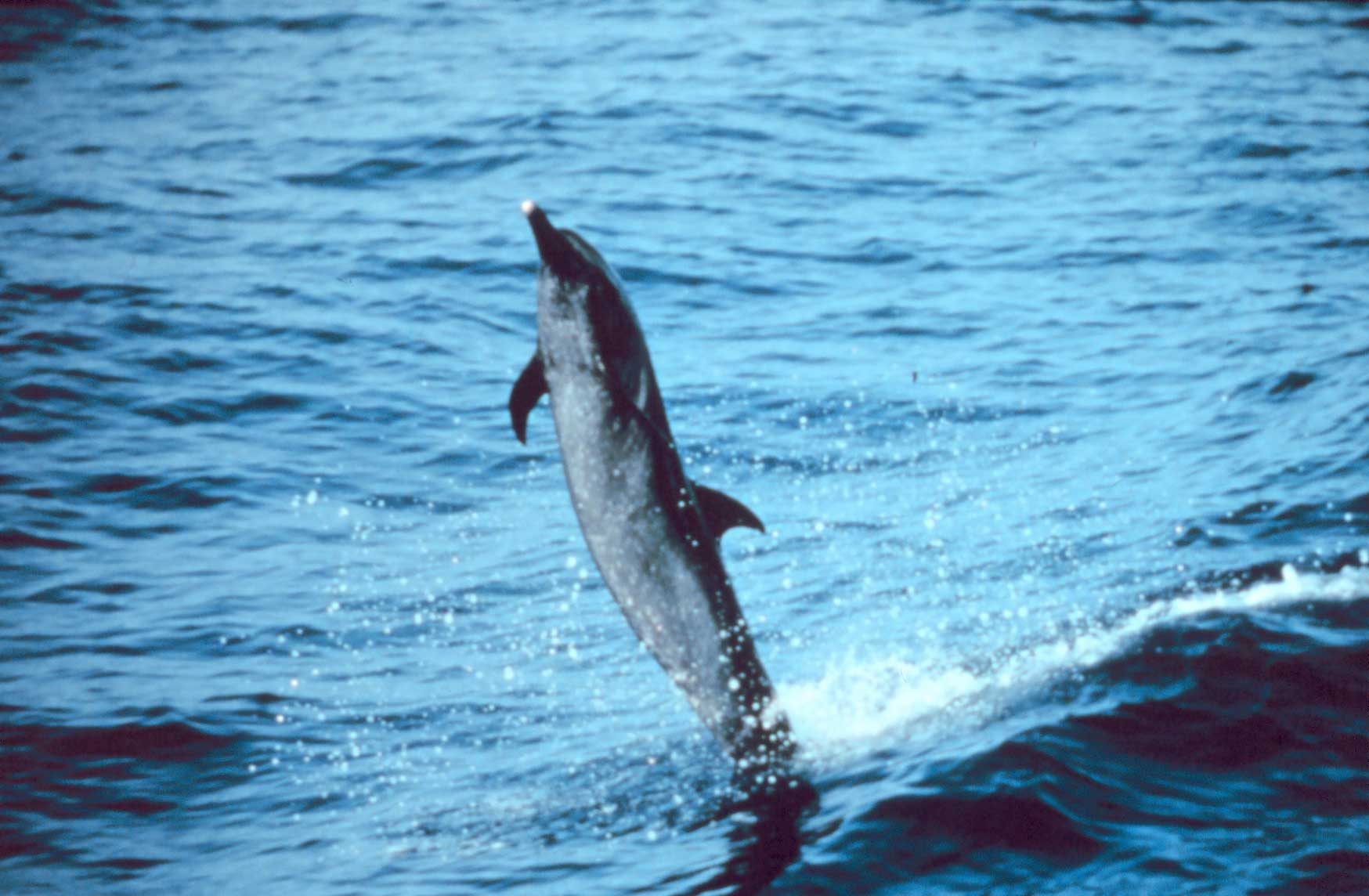
Pantropical spotted dolphin

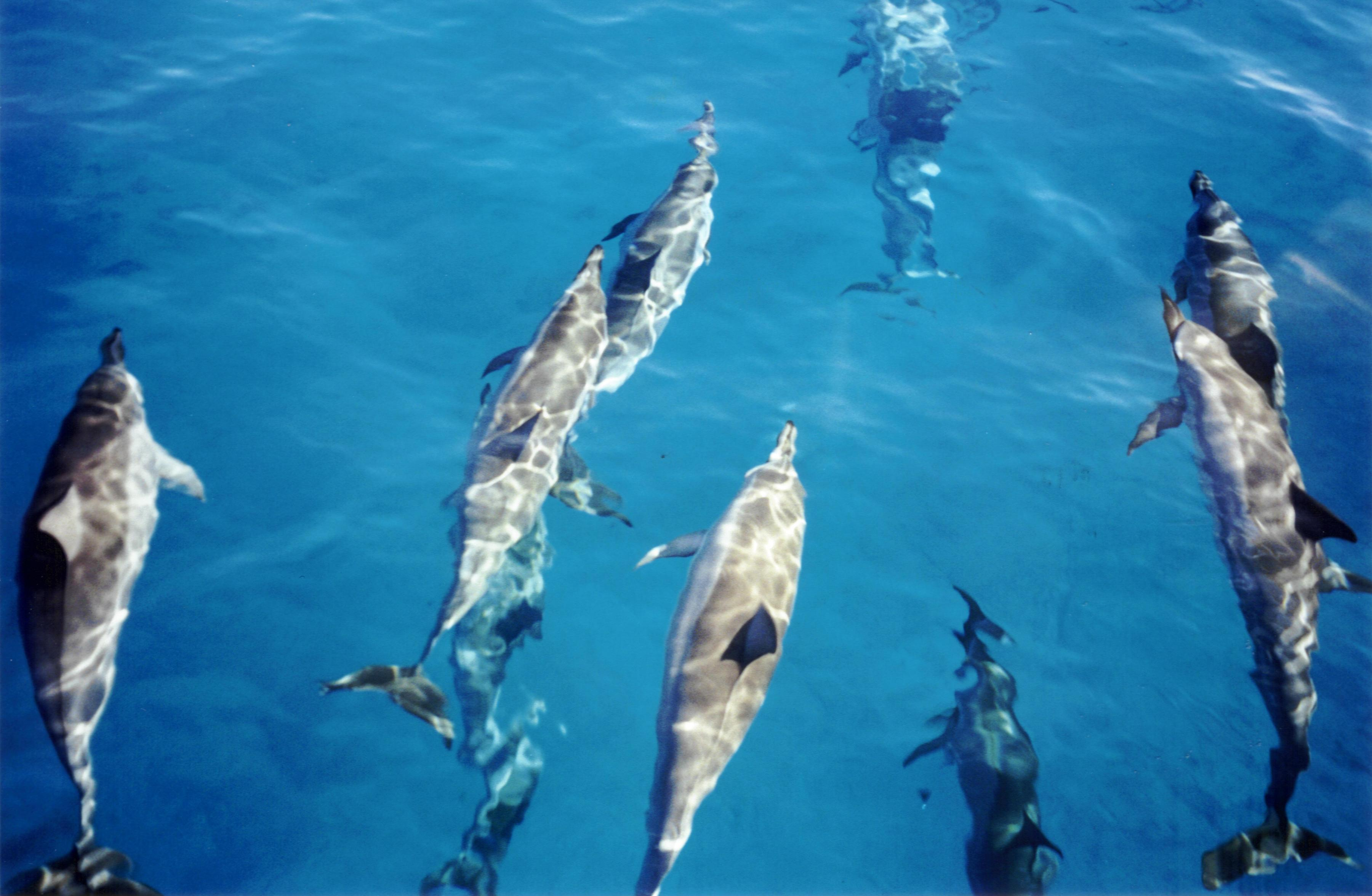
Spinner dolphins

False killer whale breaching

The order Cetacea includes whales, dolphins and porpoises. They are the mammals most fully adapted to aquatic life with a spindle-shaped nearly hairless body, protected by a thick layer of blubber, and forelimbs and tail modified to provide propulsion underwater.

- Parvorder Mysticeti: baleen whales
  - Superfamily Balaenopteroidea
    - Family Balaenopteridae: rorquals
      - Subfamily Balaenopterinae
        - Genus Balaenoptera: slender rorquals
          - Bryde's whale, Balaenoptera brydei DD
- Parvorder Odontoceti: toothed whales
  - Superfamily Delphinoidea: dolphins and relatives
    - Family Delphinidae: oceanic dolphins
      - Subfamily Delphininae
        - Genus Stenella
          - Pantropical spotted dolphin, Stenella attenuata LR/cd
          - Spinner dolphin, Stenella longirostris LR/cd
          - Striped dolphin, Stenella coeruleoalba LC
        - Genus Tursiops
          - Common bottlenose dolphin, Tursiops truncatus DD
      - Subfamily Orcininae
        - Genus Feresa
          - Pygmy killer whale, Feresa attenuata DD
        - Genus Globicephala
          - Short-finned pilot whale, Globicephala macrorhyncus LR/cd
        - Genus Orcinus
          - Killer whale (orca), Orcinus orca DD
        - Genus: Pseudorca
          - False killer whale, Pseudorca crassidens DD
  - Superfamily Physeteroidea, sperm whales
    - Family Kogiidae
      - Genus Kogia
        - Dwarf sperm whale, Kogia sima LR/lc
    - Family Physeteridae: sperm whale family
      - Genus Physeter
        - Sperm whale, Physeter macrocephalus VU
  - Superfamily Ziphioidea, beaked whales
    - Family Ziphidae, beaked whales
      - Subfamily Hyperoodontinae
        - Genus Mesoplodon, mesoplodont whales
          - Ginkgo-toothed beaked whale, Mesoplodon ginkgodens DD

== See also ==
- List of chordate orders
- Lists of mammals by region
- List of prehistoric mammals
- Mammal classification
- List of mammals described in the 2000s

== Notes ==
- Edgar Waite published an account of The Mammals, Reptiles, and Fishes of Funafuti (Australian Museum, Sydney, 1897).
