= List of mammals of San Marino =

This is a list of the mammal species recorded in San Marino. There are nine mammal species in San Marino, of which one is near threatened and another is vulnerable.

Icons which state each species' global IUCN status:
| VU | Vulnerable | Facing a high risk of extinction in the wild |
| NT | Near Threatened | Doesn't meet any criteria that would categorise it as risking extinction but likely to in the future |
| LC | Least Concern | No current identifiable risks to this species |

== Order: Rodentia (rodents) ==
- Suborder: Myomorpha
  - Family: Cricetidae
    - Subfamily: Arvicolinae
      - Genus: Clethrionomys
        - Bank vole, Clethrionomys glareolus LC
  - Family: Muridae (mice, rats, gerbils, etc.)
    - Subfamily: Murinae
      - Genus: Apodemus
        - Wood mouse, A. sylvaticus LC LC

== Order: Soricomorpha (shrews, moles, and solenodons) ==
- Family: Talpidae (moles)
  - Subfamily: Talpinae
    - Tribe: Talpini
      - Genus: Talpa
        - Blind mole, T. caeca LC

== Order: Chiroptera (bats) ==
- Family: Vespertilionidae
  - Subfamily: Miniopterinae
    - Genus: Miniopterus
      - Common bent-wing bat, M. schreibersii VU
- Family: Rhinolophidae
  - Subfamily: Rhinolophinae
    - Genus: Rhinolophus
      - Greater horseshoe bat, R. ferrumequinum LC
      - Lesser horseshoe bat, R. hipposideros LC

== Order: Carnivora (carnivorans) ==
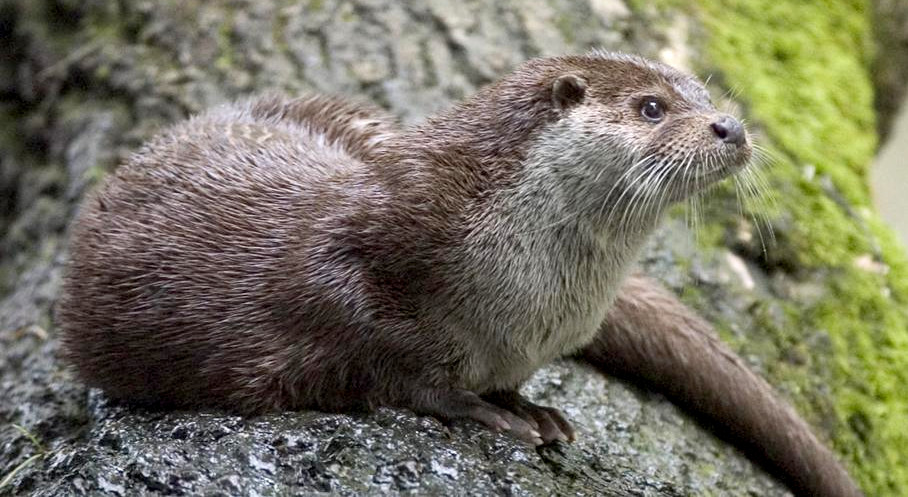
European otter

- Suborder: Caniformia
  - Family: Canidae (dogs, foxes)
    - Genus: Vulpes
      - Red fox, V. vulpes LC
  - Family: Mustelidae (mustelids)
    - Genus: Mustela
      - Least weasel, M. nivalis LC
    - Genus: Lutra
      - Eurasian otter, L. lutra NT

== See also ==
- List of chordate orders
- Lists of mammals by region
- List of prehistoric mammals
- Mammal classification
- List of mammals described in the 2000s
