= List of mammals of Monaco =

This is a list of the mammal species recorded in Monaco. There are ten mammal species in Monaco, none of which are threatened.

Icons which state each species' global IUCN status:
VU	Vulnerable	Facing a high risk of extinction in the wild
NT	Near Threatened	Doesn't meet any of the criteria that would categorise it as risking extinction but likely to in the future
LC	Least Concern	No current identifiable risks to this species

== Order: Rodentia (rodents) ==
Rodents make up the largest order of mammals, with over 40% of mammalian species. They have two incisors in the upper and lower jaw which grow continually and must be kept short by gnawing. Most rodents are small though the capybara can weigh up to 45 kg (99 lb).

- Suborder: Myomorpha
  - Family: Muridae (mice, rats, gerbils, etc.)
    - Subfamily: Murinae
      - Genus: Apodemus
        - Wood mouse, A. sylvaticus LC

== Order: Eulipotyphla (hedgehogs, shrews and moles) ==
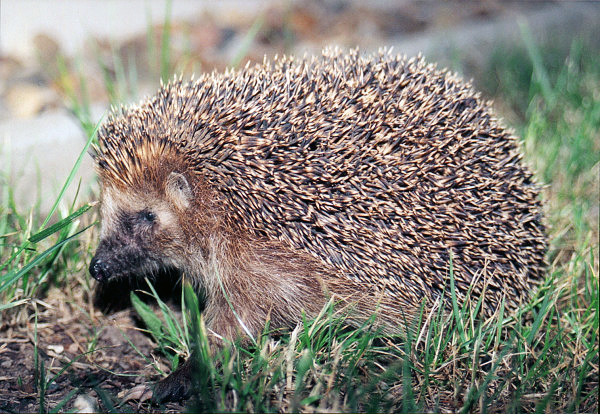
West European hedgehog

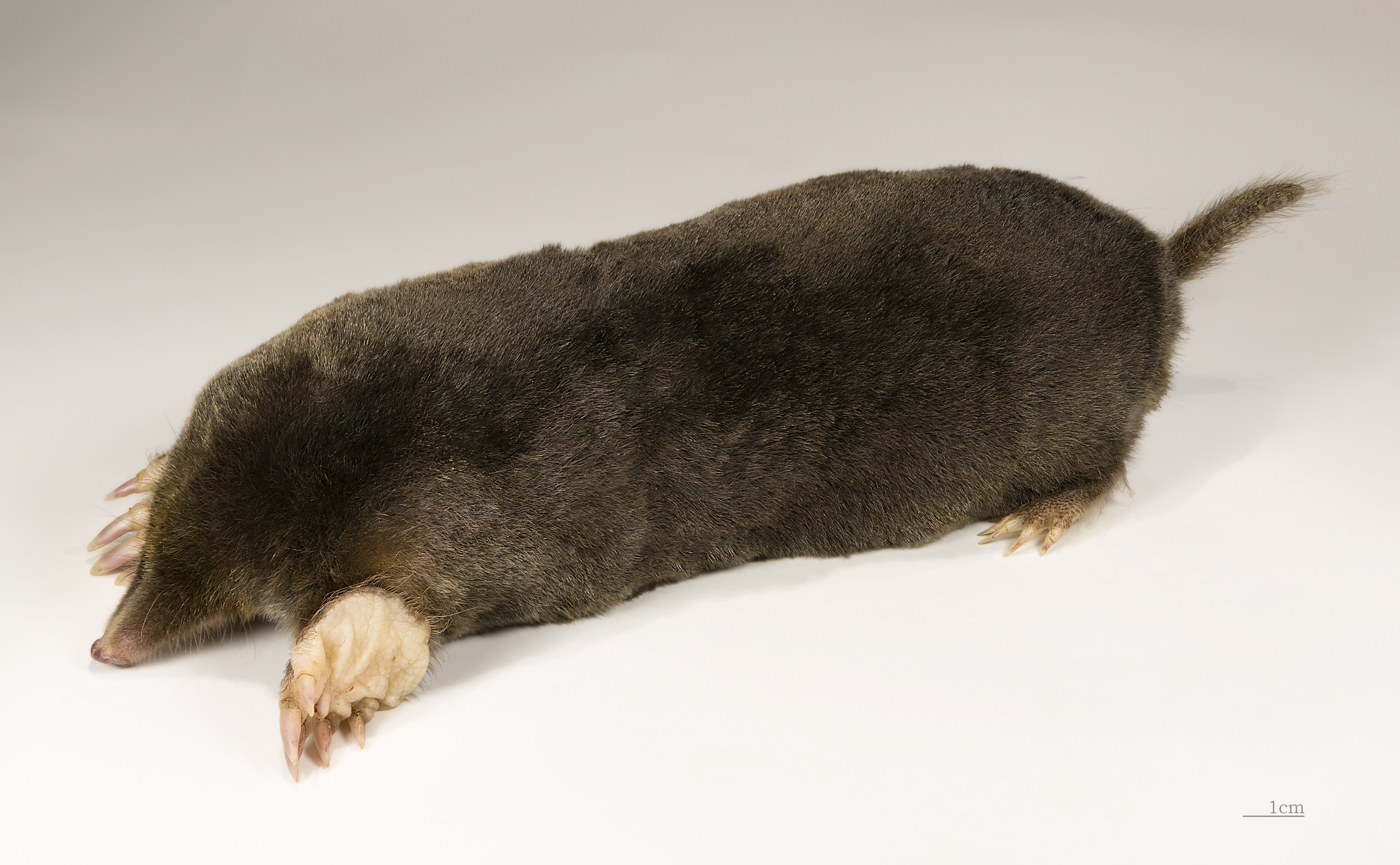
European mole

Hedgehogs are easily recognised by their spines, shrews closely resemble mice, and moles are stout-bodied burrowers.

- Family: Erinaceidae (hedgehogs)
  - Subfamily: Erinaceinae
    - Genus: Erinaceus
      - West European hedgehog, E. europaeus NT
- Family: Talpidae (moles)
  - Subfamily: Talpinae
    - Tribe: Talpini
      - Genus: Talpa
        - Mediterranean mole, Talpa caeca LC
        - European mole, Talpa europaea LC

== Order: Cetacea (whales) ==
The order Cetacea includes whales, dolphins and porpoises. They are the mammals most fully adapted to aquatic life with a spindle-shaped nearly hairless body, protected by a thick layer of blubber, and forelimbs and tail modified to provide propulsion underwater.

- Suborder: Mysticeti
  - Family: Balaenopteridae
    - Genus: Balaenoptera
      - Fin whale, Balaenoptera physalus VU
- Suborder: Odontoceti
  - Superfamily: Platanistoidea
    - Family: Delphinidae (marine dolphins)
      - Genus: Stenella
        - Striped dolphin, Stenella coeruleoalba LC
      - Genus: Delphinus
      - Common dolphin, Delphinus delphis LC

== Order: Carnivora (carnivorans) ==
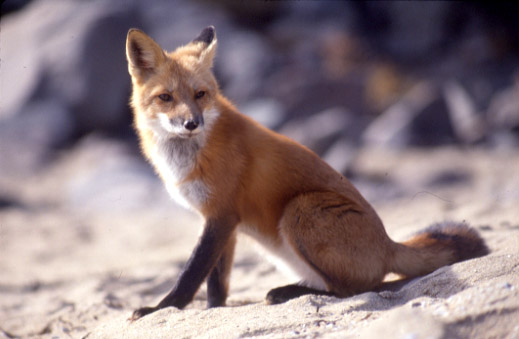
Red fox

There are over 260 species of carnivorans, the majority of which feed primarily on meat. They have a characteristic skull shape and dentition.

- Suborder: Caniformia
  - Family: Canidae (dogs, foxes)
    - Genus: Vulpes
      - Red fox, V. vulpes LC
  - Family: Mustelidae (mustelids)
    - Genus: Mustela
      - Least weasel, M. nivalis LC

== Order: Artiodactyla (even-toed ungulates) ==
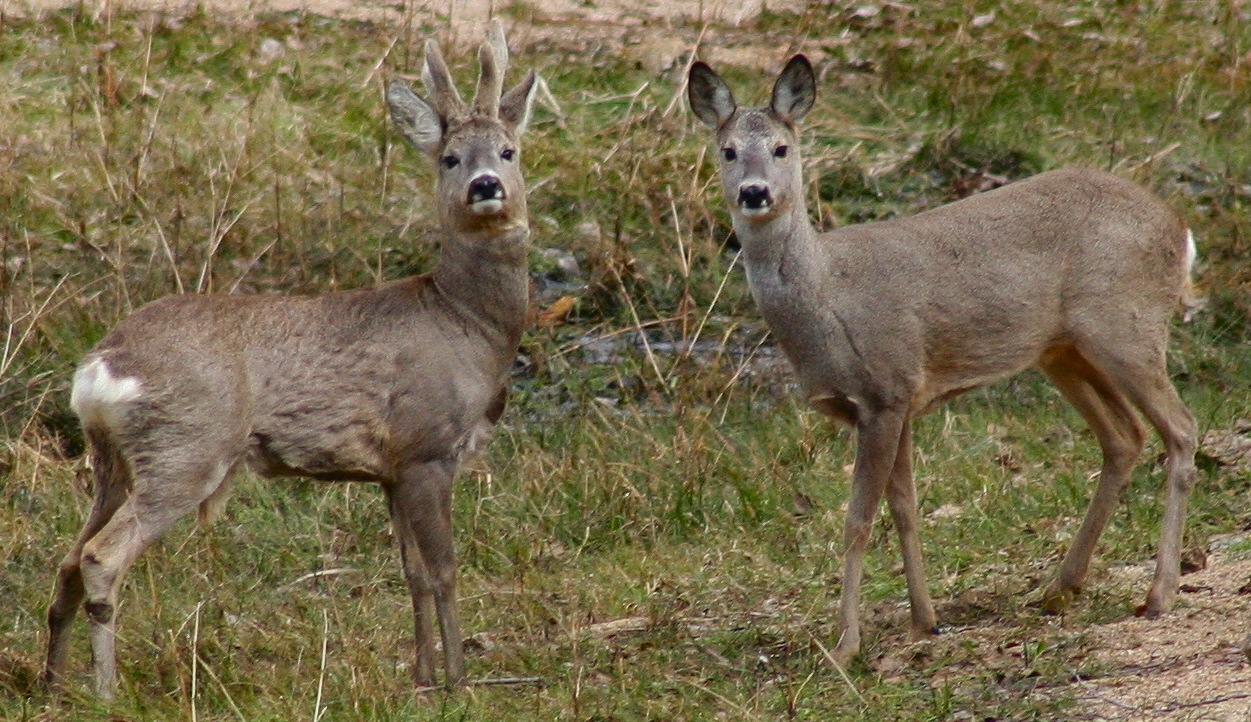
Roe deer

The even-toed ungulates are ungulates whose weight is borne about equally by the third and fourth toes, rather than mostly or entirely by the third as in perissodactyls. There are about 220 artiodactyl species, including many that are of great economic importance to humans.

- Family: Cervidae (deer)
  - Subfamily: Capreolinae
    - Genus: Capreolus
      - Roe deer, C. capreolus LC

== Locally extinct ==
The following species are locally extinct in the country:

- Brown bear, Ursus arctos

== See also ==
- List of chordate orders
- Lists of mammals by region
- List of prehistoric mammals
- Mammal classification
- List of mammals described in the 2000s
