= List of mammals of Pitcairn =

This is a list of the mammal species recorded in Pitcairn. There are four mammal species in Pitcairn, all of which are marine mammals of the order Cetacea.

The following tags are used to highlight each species' conservation status as assessed by the International Union for Conservation of Nature:

DD	Data deficient	There is inadequate information to make an assessment of the risks to this species.

Some species were assessed using an earlier set of criteria. Species assessed using this system have the following instead of near threatened and least concern categories:

LR/cd	Lower risk/conservation dependent	Species which were the focus of conservation programmes and may have moved into a higher risk category if that programme was discontinued.
LR/nt	Lower risk/near threatened	Species which are close to being classified as vulnerable but are not the subject of conservation programmes.
LR/lc	Lower risk/least concern	Species for which there are no identifiable risks.

== Order: Cetacea (whales) ==
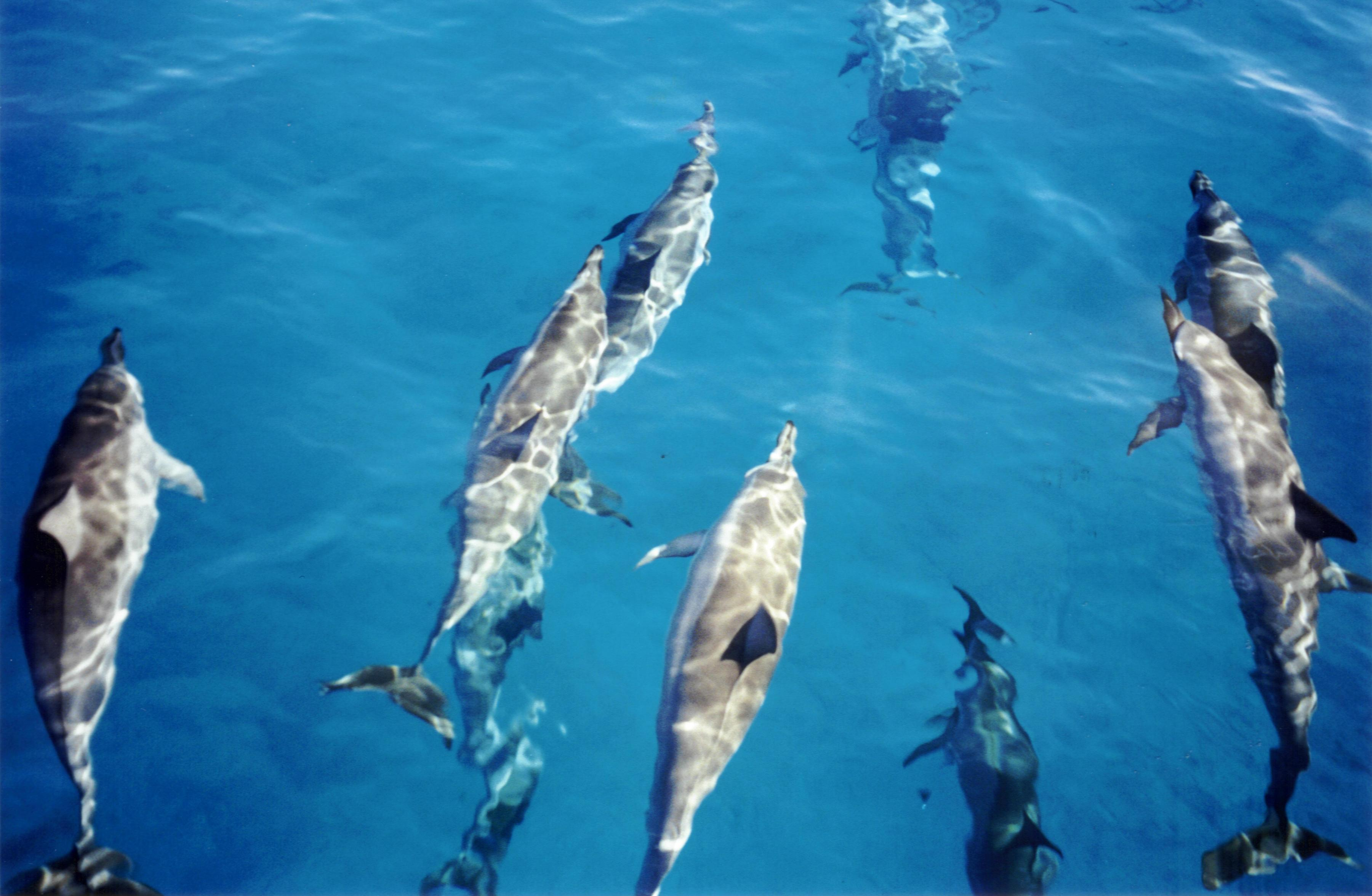
Spinner dolphins

The order Cetacea includes whales, dolphins and porpoises. They are the mammals most fully adapted to aquatic life with a spindle-shaped nearly hairless body, protected by a thick layer of blubber, and forelimbs and tail modified to provide propulsion underwater.

- Suborder: Mysticeti
  - Family: Balaenopteridae
    - Subfamily: Megapterinae
      - Genus: Megaptera
        - Humpback whale, Megaptera novaeangliae VU
- Suborder: Odontoceti
  - Superfamily: Platanistoidea
    - Family: Ziphidae
      - Subfamily: Hyperoodontinae
        - Genus: Mesoplodon
          - Ginkgo-toothed beaked whale, Mesoplodon ginkgodens DD
    - Family: Delphinidae (marine dolphins)
      - Genus: Stenella
        - Spinner dolphin, Stenella longirostris LR/cd
      - Genus: Lagenodelphis
        - Fraser's dolphin, Lagenodelphis hosei DD

== See also ==
- List of chordate orders
- Lists of mammals by region
- List of prehistoric mammals
- Mammal classification
- List of mammals described in the 2000s
