= List of mammals of the Marshall Islands =

This is a list of mammals of the Marshall Islands. There is one land mammal, the Polynesian rat. There are 27 marine mammals, one of which has been classified as vulnerable, the humpback whale.

== Land animals ==
The only extant land mammal species aside from humans on the islands is the Polynesian rat (Rattus exulans).

== Marine mammals ==
The 27 marine animals consist mostly of whales, dolphins, and porpoises.

=== Whales ===
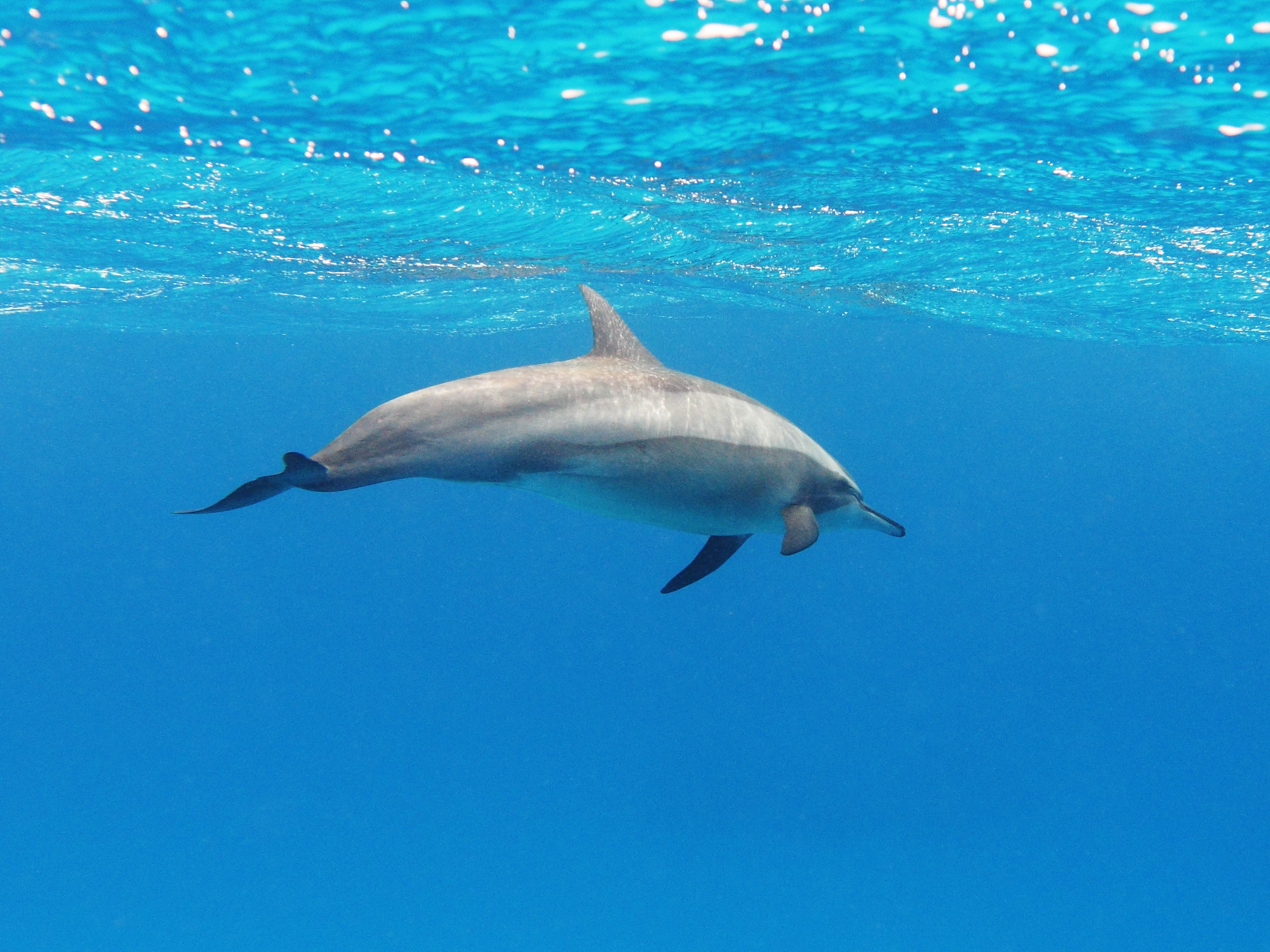
Spinner dolphin

Whales include the humpback whale, ginkgo-toothed beaked whale, Blainville's beaked whale, blue whale, sei whale, fin whale, and sperm whale.

=== Dolphins ===
Dolphins include the spinner dolphin, Fraser's dolphin, long-beaked common dolphin, and pygmy killer whale.
