= List of mammals of Louisiana =

This is a list of all wild mammal species currently found in the U.S. state of Louisiana. Louisiana has a total of 70 mammal species within its borders.

This article presents the common and scientific names for the species, and extra information.

== Eulipotyphla - shrews and moles ==
Eulipotyphla are insectivorous mammals.

Species	More information	Distribution map
Southern short-tailed shrew Blarina carolinensis	Southern short-tailed shrews inhabit roughly every part of Louisiana.	
Southeastern shrew Sorex longirostris	Southeastern shrews live in the north-eastern region of Louisiana.	
North American least shrew Cryptotis parva	North American least shrews cover practically every part of Louisiana except for a slight south-eastern strip in the New Orleans region.	
Eastern mole Scalopus aquaticus	Scalopus aquaticus are found throughout most parts of Louisiana except in the extreme southern parishes.	

== Didelphimorphia - opossums ==
Species	More information
Virginia opossum Didelphis virginiana	Virginia opossums are found throughout the state, with the majority of recent records occurring in the southern half of the state.

== Chiroptera - bats ==
Bats are winged, omnivorous mammals capable of taking flight. There are five known species of bats that inhabit throughout the state of Louisiana.

Species	More information	Distribution map
Eastern red bat Lasiurus borealis	Eastern red bat is a somewhat common bat species that lives throughout all of Louisiana.	
Evening bat Nycticeius humeralis	Evening bats are a bat species that range over the entire southeast half of the United States.	
Brazilian free-tailed bat Tadarida brasiliensis	Brazilian free-tailed bat are a species of bat that inhabit throughout all of the United States.	
Big brown bat Eptesicus fuscus	Big brown bats can be found all throughout Louisiana.	
Eastern pipistrelle Pipistrellus subflavus	Eastern pipistrelles can be found throughout the entire state of Louisiana.	
Hoary bat Lasiurus cinereus	Hoary bats can be found throughout the entirety of the U.S., including Louisiana.	
Northern yellow bat Lasiurus intermedius	Northern yellow bats can be found through almost all of Louisiana except the northern cap which borders Arkansas.	
Rafinesque's big-eared bat Corynorhinus rafinesquii	Rafinesque's big-eared bat covers practically all of Louisiana.	
Seminole bat Lasiurus seminolus	Seminole bats can be found throughout all of Louisiana.	
Silver haired bat Lasionycteris noctivagans	Silver haired bats can be found throughout all of Louisiana.	
Southeastern myotis Myotis austroriparius	Southeastern bats are found in all of north eastern Louisiana.	
Northern myotis Myotis septentrionalis	Northern myotis have been documented in Winn, Jackson, West Feliciana, and Grant parishes.	

== Cingulata - armadillos ==
Species	More information
Mexican long-nosed armadillo Dasypus mexicanus	Mexican long-nosed armadillos (one species of a complex of four that previously were recognized as Dasypus novemcinctus, the nine-banded armadillo ) are found throughout the state.

== Lagomorpha - hares and rabbits ==
Species	More information
Eastern cottontail Sylvilagus floridanus	Eastern cottontails are found throughout Louisiana.
Swamp rabbit Sylvilagus aquaticus	Swamp rabbits are found statewide in Louisiana.

== Rodentia - rodents ==
Species	More information
Family: Sciuridae (squirrels)
Eastern gray squirrel Sciurus carolinensis	Sciurus carolinensis possesses a cosmopolitan distribution in Louisiana, being absent from only the southernmost parishes.
Eastern fox squirrel Sciurus niger	S. niger are found throughout Louisiana except in the southernmost parishes.
Woodchuck; Marmota monax	Marmota monax are known only from northwestern Louisiana.
Eastern chipmunk Tamias striatus	Tamias striatus are restricted to a small area of eastern Louisiana, having been found in East Feliciana, West Feliciana, Avoyelles, and Pointe Coupee parishes.
Southern flying squirrel Glaucomys volans	Glaucomys volans are found throughout most of Louisiana except in southern coastal parishes.
Family: Geomyidae (pocket gophers)
Baird's pocket gopher Geomys breviceps	
Brazos pocket gopher Geomys brazensis	
Geomys species novum Undescribed species	
Family: Heteromyidae (pocket mice)
Hispid pocket mouse Chaetodipus hispidus	
Family: Castoridae (beavers)
North American beaver Castor canadensis	
Family: Cricetidae (New World mice, rats, and voles)
Northern pygmy mouse Baiomys taylori	
Texas marsh rice rat Oryzomys texensis	
Eastern harvest mouse Reithrodontomys humulis	
Fulvous harvest mouse Reithrodontomys fulvescens	
white-footed deer mouse Peromyscus leucopus	
Cotton deer mouse Peromyscus gossypinus	
Golden mouse Ochrotomys nuttalli	
Hispid cotton rat Sigmodon hispidus	
Eastern woodrat Neotoma floridana	
Prairie vole Microtus ochrogaster	
Woodland vole Microtus pinetorum	
Common muskrat Ondatra zibethicus	
Family: Muridae (Old World mice and rats)
House mouse Mus musculus	
Brown rat Rattus norvegicus	
Black rat Rattus rattus	
Family: Echimyidae (Coypus)
Coypu; Myocastor coypus	Also known as nutria, this is an introduced species to Louisiana.

== Carnivora - carnivores ==
Species	More information
Family: Canidae (foxes and wolves)
coyote Canis latrans	Canis latrans may be expanding its range, and is currently found statewide.
red wolf Canis rufus	According to Hoffman et al. (2024), Canis rufus had been reported by Lowery (1974) from multiple parishes west of the Mississippi River. However, the last wild individuals of C. rufus were captured in southwestern Louisiana from 1973 - 1980 to establish a captive breeding program, and the species was declared extinct in the wild (Hinton et al. 2013).
red fox Vulpes vulpes	Vulpes vulpes is found throughout Louisiana except in the southern coastal parishes.
northern gray fox Urocyon cinereoargenteus	Urocyon cinereoargenteus occur throughout Louisiana except marshlands in the southern part of the state.
Family: Ursidae (bears)
Louisiana black bear Ursus americanus luteolus	The Louisiana black bear, Ursus americanus luteolus, is one of 16 subspecies of the American black bear (Ursus americanus) in North America. Years of overhunting in the 19th and early 20th centuries and widespread deforestation to support timber and clearing lands for agriculture drastically reduced the population and distribution of Louisiana black bear, which was listed as threatened under the Endangered Species Act in 1992. After years of efforts focused largely on restoring black bear habitat, the Louisiana black bear has since recovered and was removed from the list in 2016. Currently, they are found primarily in the Atchafalaya and Mississippi river basins.
Family: Procyonidae (Raccoons and Ringtails)
Ringtail; Bassariscus astutus	
Northern raccoon Procyon lotor	
Family: Mustelidae (Weasels)
North American River Otter; Lontra canadensis	
Long-tailed weasel Neogale frenata	
American mink Neogale vison	
Family: Mephitidae (Skunks)
Plains spotted skunk Spilogale interrupta	
Alleghanian Spotted Skunk; Spilogale putorius	
Striped skunk Mephitis mephitis	
Family: Felidae (Cats)
Puma; Puma concolor	
Bobcat; Lynx rufus	
