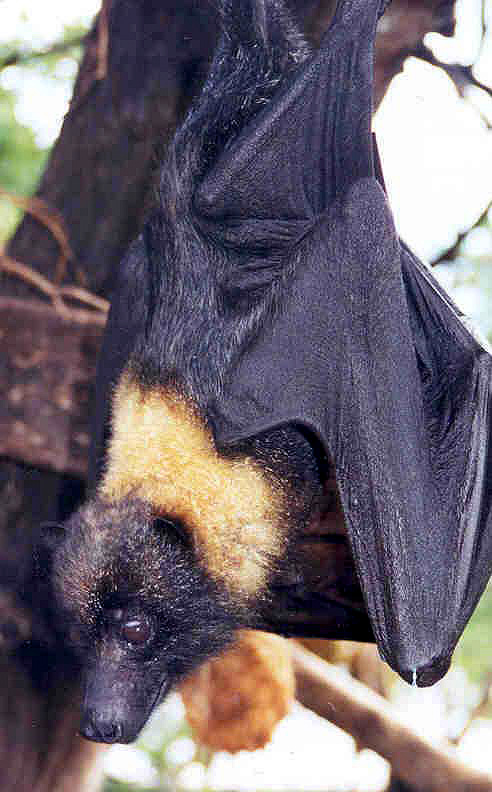

Conservation status
- Endangered (IUCN 3.1)
- CITES Appendix I

Scientific classification
- Kingdom: Animalia
- Phylum: Chordata
- Class: Mammalia
- Order: Chiroptera
- Family: Pteropodidae
- Genus: Pteropus
- Species: P. mariannus

Binomial name
- Pteropus mariannus Desmarest, 1822
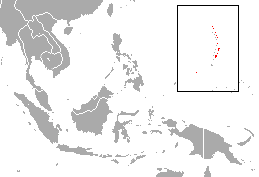
- Mariana fruit bat range

Synonyms
- Pteropus keraudren Quoy & Gaimard, 1824

= Mariana fruit bat =

Species of bat

The Mariana fruit bat (Pteropus mariannus), also known as the Mariana flying fox, and the fanihi in Chamorro, is a megabat found only in the Mariana Islands and Ulithi (an atoll in the Caroline Islands). Habitat loss has driven it to endangered status, and it is listed as threatened by the US Fish and Wildlife Service. Poaching, habitat loss, and the introduction of invasive species have contributed to the species' decline.

== Description ==
The Mariana fruit bat is a mid-sized bat which weighs 0.6 to 1.1 lb (270 to 500 g), and has a forearm length of 5.3 to 6.1 in (13.4 to 15.6 cm). Males are slightly larger in size than females. Their abdomens are colored from black to brown, while also having gray hairs. The mantle and the neck are a brighter brown to golden brown color and the head varies from brown to black. Their ears are rounded and their eyes large, giving them the features of a canid, so many megabats are called flying foxes.

== Threats ==
The bat is considered a culinary delicacy by Chamorros. Eating fruit bats is linked to a neurological disease called lytico-bodig disease. Paul Alan Cox from the Hawaiian National Tropical Botanical Garden in Kalaheo, and Oliver Sacks from Albert Einstein College in New York, found the bats consumed large quantities of cycad seeds, and - like some eagles, which were shown to build up levels of the pesticide DDT in fat tissue - probably accumulate the toxins to dangerous levels.

== Conservation ==
The Mariana Fruit Bat was first proposed for review by the U.S. Fish and Wildlife Service in May 1979. In 1983, the species was listed as an endangered species by the USFWS. The draft of the recovery plan for the Mariana Fruit Bat was sent for review in 2010.

In 2001, the population was estimated to number between 300 and 400 bats on Sarigan. The current population numbers are unknown, but one known concentration is on Ritidian Point in Guam. In 2013, Bat Conservation International listed this species as one of the 35 species of its worldwide priority list of conservation.

== Behavior ==
Johnson and Wiles described roosting behavior: "Sarigan's population differs from those of larger islands in the archipelago by usually having smaller roost sizes, typically 3–75 bats, and large numbers of solitary bats that at times comprise up to half of the population. Colonies and smaller aggregations were composed primarily of harems with multiple females, whereas a nearly equal sex ratio occurred among solitary animals."

== Subspecies ==
Pteropus mariannus has three subspecies:

- P. m. mariannus (Guam Mariana fruit bat)
- P. m. paganensis (Pagan Mariana fruit bat)
- P. m. ulthiensis (Ulithi Mariana fruit bat)

== Gallery ==
Conservation poster from USFWS and CNMI Division of Fish & Wildlife

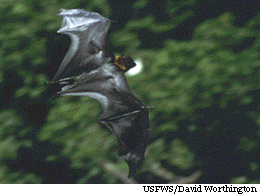
Mariana fruit bat (Pteropus mariannus mariannus) in flight (USFWS)

== See also ==
- Bat (food)
