= Fauna of Finland =

Native animals of Finland

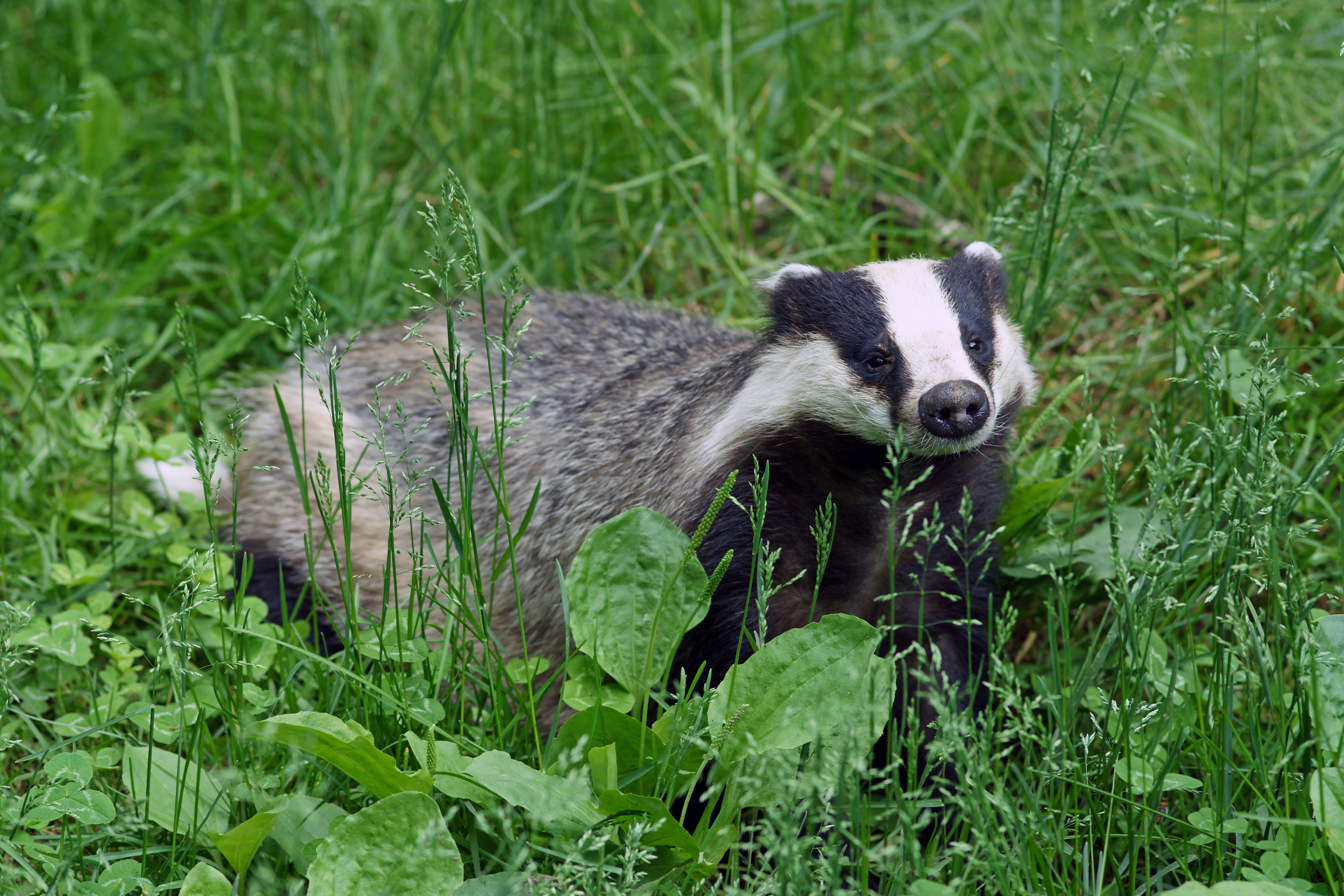

This is a list of the fauna of Finland. Finland borders Sweden to the west, Russia to the east, and Norway to the north, while Estonia lies to its south across the Gulf of Finland, allowing an ecological mix. Finland contains many species of mammals, birds, and fish, but only a few reptiles and amphibians. This article discusses all the vertebrate animals which can be found on Finland itself, not the oceans.

== Mammals ==
There are over 90 species of mammals found in Finland and the surrounding oceans. Some were introduced from other countries in Europe, as well as other continents, such as Asia and North America. Rodents and shrews are most common in Finland.

=== Rodents ===
There are close to 30 species of rodents living throughout Finland. These include the widespread Muridae, such as the house mouse, brown rat and wood mouse which live throughout Europe, and the Norway lemming, which only lives in Scandinavia. Some were introduced there, and they include the muskrat and nutria among others.

- House mouse, Mus musculus (common)
- Brown rat, Rattus norvegicus (common)
- Black rat, Rattus rattus (uncommon)
- Striped field mouse, Apodemus agrarius (common)
- Yellow-necked mouse, Apodemus flavicollis (common)
- Harvest mouse, Micromys minutus (common)
- Common vole, Microtus arvalis (common)
- Field vole, Microtus agrestis (common)
- Tundra vole, Microtus oeconomus (common)
- Southern vole, Microtus rossiaemeridionalis (common)
- Water vole, Arvicola terrestris (common)
- Bank vole, Clethrionomys glareolus (common)
- Grey red-backed vole, Clethrionomys rufocanus (common)
- Northern red-backed vole, Clethrionomys rutilus (common)
- Norway lemming, Lemmus lemmus (common)
- Wood lemming, Myopus schisticolor (uncommon)
- Muskrat, Ondatra zibethicus (common/introduced from North America)
- Northern birch mouse, Sicista betulina (common)
- Garden dormouse, Eliomys quercinus (rare)
- Red squirrel, Sciurus vulgaris (common)
- Siberian flying squirrel, Pteromys volans (rare)
- European beaver, Castor fiber (rare, though increasing)
- North American beaver, Castor canadensis (much more common than the European beaver/introduced from North America)
- Nutria, Myocastor coypus (rare/introduced from South America)

=== Lagomorphs ===
There are 3 species of rabbits and hares found in Finland. The common rabbit spread there from central Europe. It is now found in practically all of Europe. The other two species are hares.

- European rabbit, Oryctolagus cuniculus (common/spread from central Europe)
- Brown hare, Lepus europaeus (common)
- Mountain hare, Lepus timidus (common)

=== Insectivores ===
There are 10 species of insectivore living in Finland. Eight of the ten are shrews, from the common shrew to the Eurasian water shrew. Shrews are very common in the forests of Finland. A species of mole and one of hedgehog are the remaining insectivores.

- Common shrew, Sorex araneus (common)
- Eurasian least shrew, Sorex minutissimus (common)
- Eurasian pygmy shrew, Sorex minutus (common)
- Taiga shrew, Sorex isodon (common)
- Laxmann's shrew, Sorex caecutiens (common)
- Eurasian water shrew, Neomys fodiens (common)
- Western European hedgehog, Erinaceus europaeus (common)
- European mole, Talpa europaea (common)

=== Bats ===
About 13 kinds of bat live in Finland.

- Common noctule, Nyctalus noctula (common)
- Daubenton's bat, Myotis daubentonii (common)
- Pond bat, Myotis dasycneme (scarce)
- Whiskered bat, Myotis mystacinus (localised)
- Brandt's bat, Myotis brandtii (common)
- Natterer's bat, Myotis nattereri (common)
- Northern bat, Eptesicus nilssoni (common)
- Common pipistrelle, Pipistrellus pipistrellus (common)
- Brown long-eared bat, Plecotus auritus (common)
- Parti-colored bat, Vespertilio murinus (scarce)

=== Carnivores ===
Around 15 species of carnivore are found in Finland. Many of the larger carnivores were or are still in danger of dying out.

- Least weasel, Mustela nivalis (common)
- Ermine, Mustela erminea (common)
- European polecat, Mustela putorius (common)
- European mink, Mustela lutreola (very rare)
- Pine marten, Martes martes (common)
- European otter, Lutra lutra (uncommon)
- Eurasian badger, Meles meles (common)
- Wolverine, Gulo gulo (rare)
- Red fox, Vulpes vulpes (common)
- Arctic fox, Alopex lagopus (uncommon)
- Raccoon dog, Nyctereutes procyonoides (common/introduced from Asia)
- Gray wolf, Canis lupus (rare)
- Eurasian lynx, Lynx lynx (rare)
- Brown bear, Ursus arctos (uncommon)

=== Pinnipeds ===
Pinnipeds includes all the seals, sea lions, and the walrus. Four pinnipeds are native to Finland year round (most living on the northern coast), but other species, such as the walrus, may migrate there during certain times of the year. The Saimaa ringed seal is a subspecies of ringed seal native exclusively to Finland and is a famous animal there, though it is also one of the most endangered seal subspecies in the world.

- Harbor seal, Phoca vitulina (uncommon)
- Ringed seal, Pusa hispida (uncommon)
- Gray seal, Halichoerus grypus (common)

=== Artiodactyls ===
The order of Artiodactyl includes all even-hooved mammals. There are about 10 species that can be found in Finland. Many species have been either introduced or reintroduced there.

- Wild boar, Sus scrofa (common)
- Roe deer, Capreolus capreolus (common)
- White-tailed deer, Odocoileus virginianus (common/introduced from North America)
- Fallow deer, Dama dama (uncommon/introduced from other parts of Europe)
- Red deer, Cervus elaphus (very rare/became extinct but recently spreading from Sweden)
- Reindeer, Rangifer tarandus (common)
- Moose, Alces alces (common)
- Mouflon, Ovis musimon (rare/introduced from central Europe)

=== Cetaceans ===
This order includes all the whales, toothed whales, and dolphins of the different waters. Finland does not have any large Cetacean species within its territories. Finland's only coast is on the baltic sea which is home to the harbour porpoise (Phocoena phocoena) which is the smallest of the dolphin species in the world's oceans. However, the population of harbour porpoise in the Baltic Sea has dropped dramatically since the mid-1950s and is now at under 500. The top current threats for Baltic harbour porpoise are bycatch in fisheries, environmental toxins mostly from the Swedish paper industry and anthropogenic noise.

== Birds ==
There are around 340 different kinds of birds all over Finland, from the cold north, to the temperate south. Most are native all year, but some species migrate to warmer areas during the winter. Like mammals, some of Finlands birds have been introduced.

=== Grebes and loons ===
Grebes and loons are two separate orders of birds. They are both semi-aquatic and appear similar to ducks.

- Dabchick, Tachybaptus ruficollis (uncommon)
- Horned grebe, Podiceps auritus (common)
- Great crested grebe, Podiceps cristatus (common)
- Red-necked grebe, Podiceps grisegena (common)
- Black-necked grebe, Podiceps nigricollis (uncommon)
- Common loon, Gavia immer (common)
- Red-throated loon, Gavia stellata (common)
- Arctic loon, Gavia arctica (common)
- Yellow-billed loon, Gavia adamsii (rare)

=== Albatrosses and petrels ===
Albatrosses and petrels are two of the four families of marine diving birds that make up this order. Some of them look similar to sea gulls, but are found further out at sea. They live mostly off the coasts of Finland.

- Northern fulmar, Fulmarus glacialis (common)
- Manx shearwater, Puffinus puffinus (common)
- Sooty shearwater, Puffinus griseus (rare)
- European storm petrel, Hydrobates pelagicus (common)
- Leach's storm petrel, Oceanodroma leucorhoa (common)
- Madeiran storm petrel, Oceanodroma castro (common)
- Wilson's petrel, Oceanites oceanicus (rare)

=== Pelicaniforms ===
This includes not only pelicans, but also gannets and cormorants. There are 6 families in this order but only a few species are found in Finland.

- Northern gannet, Morus bassana (common)
- Great cormorant, Phalacrocorax carbo (common)
- Common shag, Phalacrocorax aristotelis (uncommon)

=== Herons and storks ===
Herons and storks are just two of the better known families in this order, which contains a total of six families. All are wading birds who generally have predatory characteristics.

- Little bittern, Ixobrychus minutus (uncommon)
- Great bittern, Botaurus stellaris (common)
- Little egret, Egretta garzetta (common)
- Gray heron, Ardea cinerea (common)
- Night heron, Nycticorax nycticorax (common)
- White stork, Ciconia ciconia (uncommon)
- Eurasian spoonbill, Platalea leucorodia (common)

=== Ducks ===
This order contains the ducks, geese, and swans. All are in a single family, which is very large and has species from all over the world. Finland has many species.

- Greylag goose, Anser anser (common)
- Snow goose, Anser caerulescens (common)
- Lesser white-fronted goose, Anser erythropus (uncommon)
- Greater white-fronted goose, Anser albifrons (common)
- Bean goose, Anser fabalis (common)
- Pink-footed goose, Anser brachyrhynchus (common)
- Mallard, Anas platyrhynchos (common)
- Common teal, Anas crecca (common)
- Blue-winged teal, Anas discors (rare)
- Northern pintail, Anas acuta (common)
- Northern shoveler, Anas clypeata (common)
- Eurasian wigeon, Anas penelope (common)
- Gadwall, Anas strepera (common)
- Garganey, Anas querquedula (common)
- Tufted duck, Aythya fuligula (common)
- Ring-necked duck, Aythya collaris (rare)
- Lesser scaup, Aythya affinis (common)
- Greater scaup, Aythya marila (common)
- Common pochard, Aythya ferina (common)
- Barnacle goose, Branta leucopsis (common)
- Brent goose, Branta bernicla (common)
- Red-breasted goose, Branta ruficollis (very rare)
- Canada goose, Branta canadensis (common/introduced from North America)
- Common shelduck, Tadorna tadorna (common)
- Ruddy shelduck, Tadorna ferruginea (common)
- Mandarin duck, Aix galericulata (rare/introduced from Asia)
- Whooper swan, Cygnus cygnus (common)
- Mute swan, Cygnus olor (common)
- Tundra swan, Cygnus columbianus (common)
- Common eider, Somateria mollissima (common)
- King eider, Somateria spectabilis (common)
- Steller's eider, Polysticta stelleri (rare)
- Red-crested pochard, Netta rufina (common)
- Common scoter, Melanitta nigra (common)
- Velvet scoter, Melanitta fusca (common)
- Smew, Mergus albellus (common)
- Goosander, Mergus merganser (common)
- Red-breasted merganser, Mergus serrator (common)
- Common goldeneye, Bucephala clangula (common)
- Long-tailed duck, Clangula hyemalis (common)
- Ruddy duck, Oxyura jamaicensis (common/introduced from South America)

=== Grouse and pheasants ===
These include all the fowl of the world. Many species live in Finland and are a common food source.

- Hazel grouse, Bonasa bonasia (common)
- Black grouse, Tetrao tetrix (common)
- Western capercaillie, Tetrao urogallus (common)
- Willow ptarmigan, Lagopus lagopus (common)
- Rock ptarmigan, Lagopus muta (common)
- Common quail, Coturnix coturnix (common)
- Grey partridge, Perdix perdix (common)
- Common pheasant, Phasianus colchicus (common/introduced from Asia)

=== Birds of prey ===
These are the most predatory birds in the world. There are five families in all. Eagles, hawks, falcons, and osprey can all be found in Finland.

- Northern goshawk, Accipiter gentilis (common)
- Eurasian sparrowhawk, Accipiter nisus (uncommon)
- Lesser spotted eagle, Aquila pomarina (rare)
- Greater spotted eagle, Aquila clanga (rare)
- Golden eagle, Aquila chrysaetos (uncommon)
- Hen harrier, Circus cyaneus (common)
- Western marsh harrier, Circus aeruginosus (common)
- Montagu's harrier, Circus pygargus (rare)
- Common buzzard, Buteo buteo (common)
- Rough-legged buzzard, Buteo lagopus (uncommon)
- European honey buzzard, Pernis apivorus (common)
- Red kite, Milvus milvus (rare)
- Black kite, Milvus migrans (rare)
- White-tailed eagle, Haliaeetus albicilla (common)
- Osprey, Pandion haliaetus (common)
- Merlin falcon, Falco columbarius (uncommon)
- Red-footed falcon, Falco vespertinus (uncommon)
- Peregrine falcon, Falco peregrinus (rare)
- Common kestrel, Falco tinnunculus (common)
- Eurasian hobby, Falco subbuteo (common)
- Gyrfalcon, Falco rusticolus (common)

=== Gruiforms ===
There are 12 families in this order, which contains wading and ground birds. Cranes, rails, and bustards are the larger of the families, and contain members living in Finland.

- Corn crake, Crex crex (common)
- Spotted crake, Porzana porzana (common)
- Little crake, Porzana parva (common)
- Water rail, Rallus aquaticus (common)
- Common moorhen, Gallinula chloropus (common)
- Eurasian coot, Fulica atra (common)
- Allen's gallinule, Porphyrio alleni (rare)
- Common crane, Grus grus (common)
- Little bustard, Tetrax tetrax (very rare)

=== Charadriforms ===
This is a large order which contains many kinds of semi-aquatic and coastal birds. Plovers, sandpipers, gulls, and puffins are some of the members of the order. They all occur in Finland.

- Common ringed plover, Charadrius hiaticula (common)
- Little ringed plover, Charadrius dubius (common)
- European golden plover, Pluvialis apricaria (common)
- Grey plover, Pluvialis squatarola (uncommon)
- Eurasian dotterel, Charadrius morinellus (common)
- Northern lapwing, Vanellus vanellus (common)
- Sociable lapwing, Vanellus gregarius (rare)
- Eurasian oystercatcher, Haematopus ostralegus (common)
- Common sandpiper, Actitis hypoleucos (common)
- Curlew sandpiper, Calidris ferruginea (common)
- Purple sandpiper, Calidris maritima (common)
- Pectoral sandpiper, Calidris melanotos (rare)
- White-rumped sandpiper, Calidris fuscicollis (rare)
- Baird's sandpiper, Calidris bairdii (rare)
- Sharp-tailed sandpiper, Calidris acuminata (very rare)
- Little stint, Calidris minuta (common)
- Temminck's stint, Calidris temminckii (common)
- Red knot, Calidris canutus (common)
- Sanderling, Calidris alba (common)
- Dunlin, Calidris alpina (uncommon)
- Wood sandpiper, Tringa glareola (common)
- Marsh sandpiper, Tringa stagnatilis (common)
- Green sandpiper, Tringa ochropus (common)
- Common redshank, Tringa totanus (common)
- Spotted redshank, Tringa erythropus (uncommon)
- Common greenshank, Tringa nebularia (common)
- Lesser yellowlegs, Tringa flavipes (very rare)
- Broad-billed sandpiper, Limicola falcinellus (common)
- Buff-breasted sandpiper, Tryngites subruficollis (uncommon)
- Terek sandpiper, Xenus cinereus (common)
- Eurasian whimbrel, Numenius phaeopus (common)
- Eurasian curlew, Numenius arquata (common)
- Common snipe, Gallinago gallinago (common)
- Great snipe, Gallinago media (common)
- Jack snipe, Lymnocryptes minimus (common)
- Red phalarope, Phalaropus fulicarius (uncommon)
- Red-necked phalarope, Phalaropus lobatus (common)
- Wilson's phalarope, Phalaropus tricolor (rare)
- Black-tailed godwit, Limosa limosa (common)
- Bar-tailed godwit, Limosa lapponica (common)
- Long-billed dowitcher, Limnodromus scolopaceus (common)
- Eurasian woodcock, Scolopax rusticola (common)
- Ruddy turnstone, Arenaria interpres (common)
- Ruff, Philomachus pugnax (common)
- Pied avocet, Recurvirostra avosetta (common)
- Black-winged stilt, Himantopus himantopus (rare)
- Stone curlew, Burhinus oedicnemus (uncommon)
- Black-winged pratincole, Glareola nordmanni (very rare)
- Great skua, Stercorarius skua (uncommon)
- Arctic skua, Stercorarius parasiticus (common)
- Pomarine skua, Stercorarius pomarinus (common)
- Long-tailed skua, Stercorarius longicaudus (common)
- Little gull, Larus minutus (common)
- Herring gull, Larus argentatus (common)
- Black-headed gull, Larus ridibundus (common)
- Mew gull, Larus canus (common)
- Glaucous gull, Larus hyperboreus (common)
- Lesser black-backed gull, Larus fuscus (common)
- Great black-backed gull, Larus marinus (common)
- Laughing gull, Larus atricilla (rare)
- Slender-billed gull, Larus genei (rare)
- Black-legged kittiwake, Rissa tridactyla (common)
- Ivory gull, Pagophila eburnea (uncommon)
- Ross's gull, Rhodostethia rosea (rare)
- Common tern, Sterna hirundo (common)
- Arctic tern, Sterna paradisaea (common)
- Little tern, Sterna albifrons (common)
- Black tern, Chlidonias niger (common)
- Sandwich tern, Sterna sandvicensis (common)
- Caspian tern, Sterna caspia (common)
- White-winged tern, Chlidonias leucopterus (rare)
- Dovekie, Alle alle (common)
- Atlantic puffin, Fratercula arctica (uncommon)
- Razorbill, Alca torda (common)
- Black guillemot, Cepphus grylle (common)
- Common guillemot, Uria aalge (common)
- Brünnich's guillemot, Uria lomvia (rare)

=== Pigeons ===
These are small birds that are very familiar to city people because of feral rock pigeons, which occur worldwide.

- Rock pigeon, Columba livia (common)
- Common wood pigeon, Columba palumbus (common)
- Stock dove, Columba oenas (common)
- Collared dove, Streptopelia decaocto (common)
- European turtle dove, Streptopelia turtur (common)
- Oriental turtle dove, Streptopelia orientalis (rare)

=== Cuckoos ===
This family of birds is unique in that the mother bird may lay her eggs in another species nest, and have that female take care of her young. Only one species is found in Finland.

- Common cuckoo, Cuculus canorus (common)

=== Owls ===
Owls are considered nocturnal birds of prey. They hunt and are mostly active during the night. Two families, the owls and barn owls, make up this order.

- Tawny owl, Strix aluco (common)
- Ural owl, Strix uralensis (uncommon)
- Great grey owl, Strix nebulosa (uncommon)
- Eurasian eagle owl, Bubo bubo (common)
- Snowy owl, Bubo scandiacus (common)
- Short-eared owl, Asio flammeus (common)
- Long-eared owl, Asio otus (common)
- Northern hawk owl, Surnia ulula (common)
- Tengmalm's owl, Aegolius funereus (common)
- Eurasian pygmy owl, Glaucidium passerinum (common)
- Little owl, Athene noctua (uncommon)
- Barn owl, Tyto alba (rare)

=== Nightjars ===
Only one species in this order is found all over Europe. Nightjars and their relatives are nocturnal and some show predatory behavior.

- European nightjar, Caprimulgus europaeus (common)

=== Swifts ===
Swifts are a family of quick flying birds related to hummingbirds.

- Common swift, Apus apus (common)
- White-throated needletail, Hirundapus caudacutus (rare)

=== Coraciforms ===
This order includes rollers, kingfishers, bee-eaters, and others. Most of these birds have very large beaks in proportion to their bodies.

- Common kingfisher, Alcedo atthis (common)
- European roller, Coracias garrulus (common)
- European bee-eater, Merops apiaster (uncommon)
- Hoopoe, Upupa epops (rare/probably introduced from other parts of Europe)

=== Woodpeckers ===
The woodpeckers can make holes in trees with their strong beaks.

- Eurasian wryneck, Jynx torquilla (common)
- Black woodpecker, Dryocopus martius (common)
- European green woodpecker, Picus viridus (common)
- Grey-headed woodpecker, Picus canus (common)
- Lesser spotted woodpecker, Dendrocopos minor (common)
- Great spotted woodpecker, Dendrocopos major (common)
- White-backed woodpecker, Dendrocopos leucotos (rare)
- Eurasian three-toed woodpecker, Picoides tridactylus (common)

== Reptiles ==
see List of reptiles of Finland

== See also ==
- List of mammals of Finland
