= List of mammals of Finland =

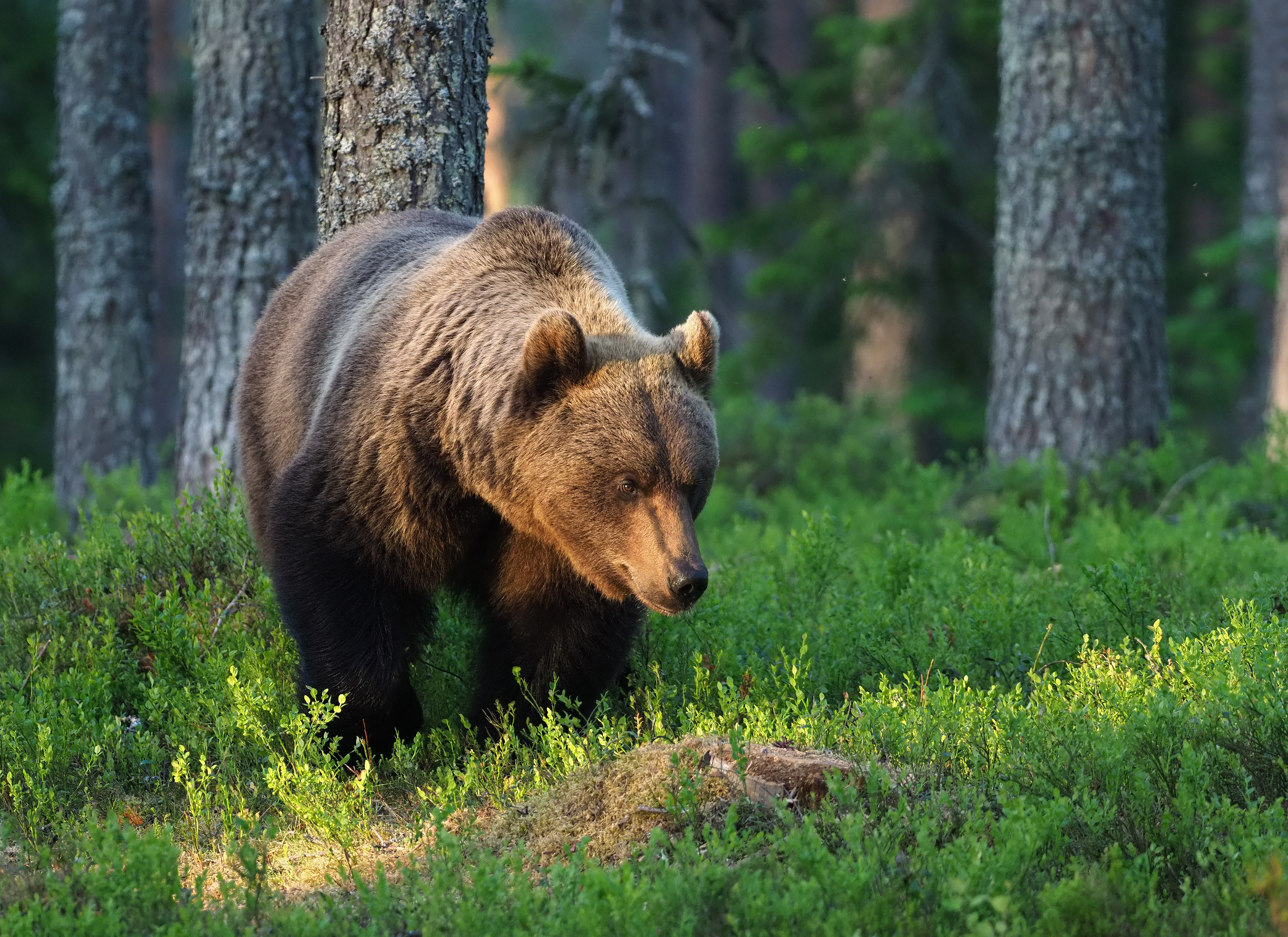
The brown bear (Ursus arctos), is the national animal of Finland

This is a list of the mammal species recorded in Finland. There are sixty-one mammal species in Finland, of which, one is endangered, three are vulnerable, and five are near threatened. This list is derived from the IUCN Red List which lists species of mammals and includes those mammals that have recently been classified as extinct (since 1500 AD).

Icons which state each species' global IUCN status:
| CR | Critically Endangered | In imminent risk of extinction in the wild |
| EN | Endangered | Facing an extremely high risk of extinction in the wild |
| VU | Vulnerable | Facing a high risk of extinction in the wild |
| NT | Near Threatened | Doesn't meet any criteria that would categorise it as risking extinction but likely to in the future |
| LC | Least Concern | No current identifiable risks to this species |
| DD | Data Deficient | Inadequate information to make an assessment of the risks to this species |

== Order: Rodentia (rodents) ==
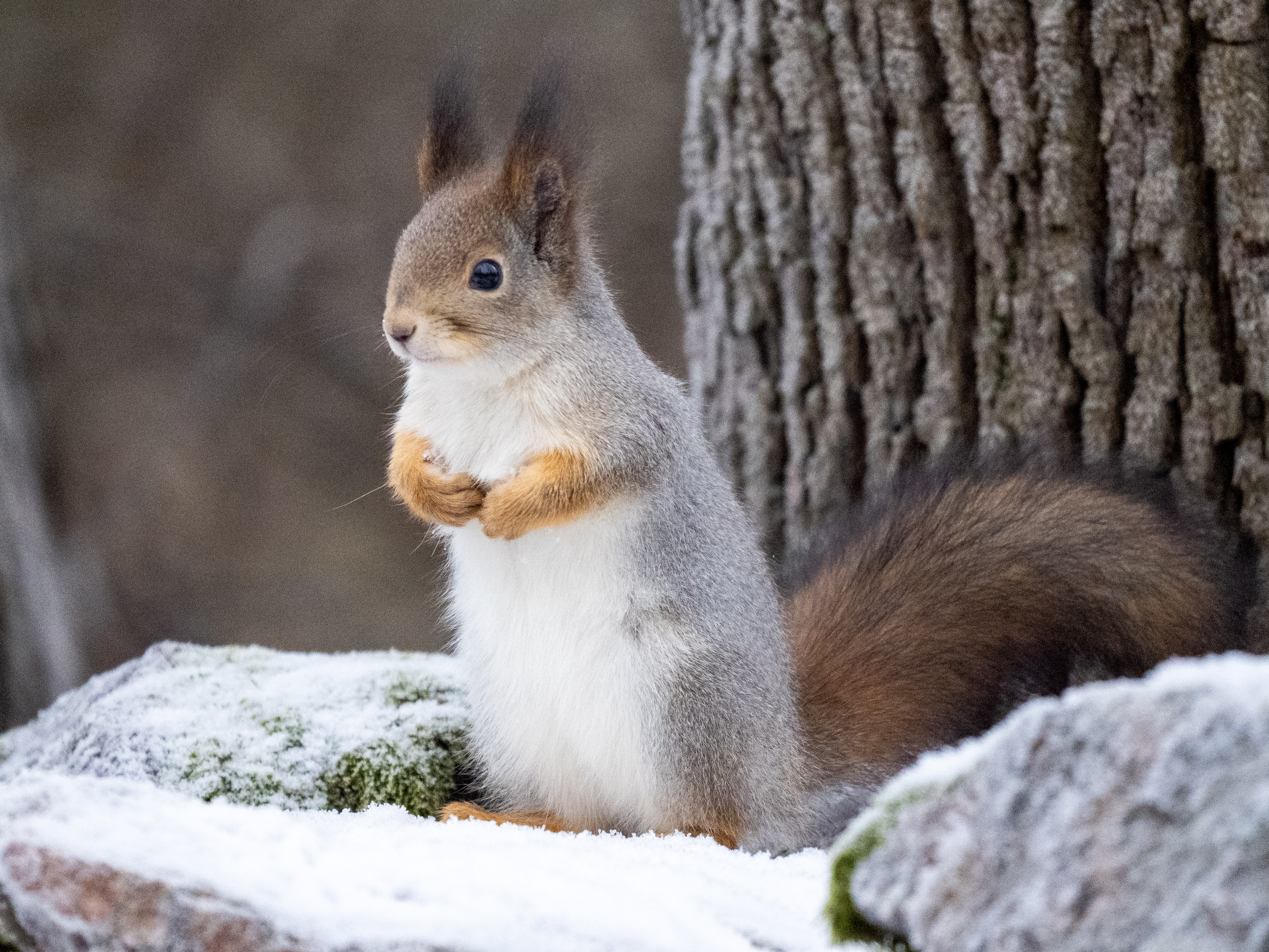
Red squirrel

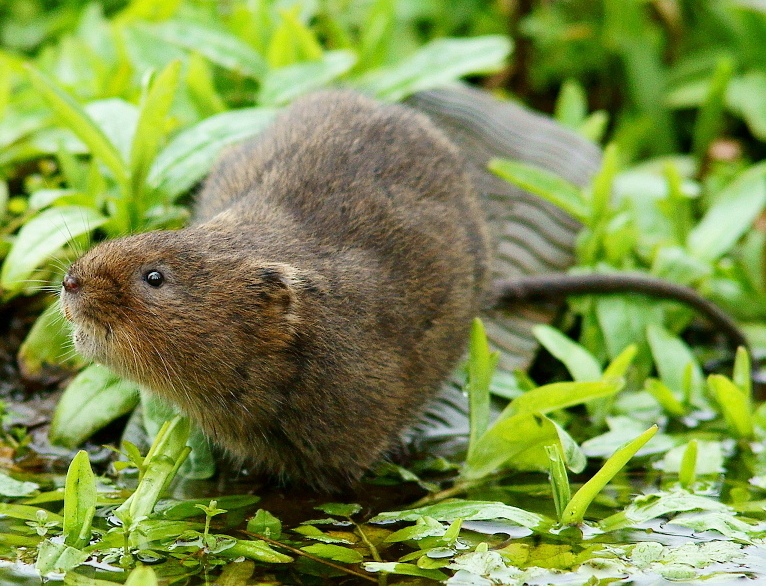
Water vole

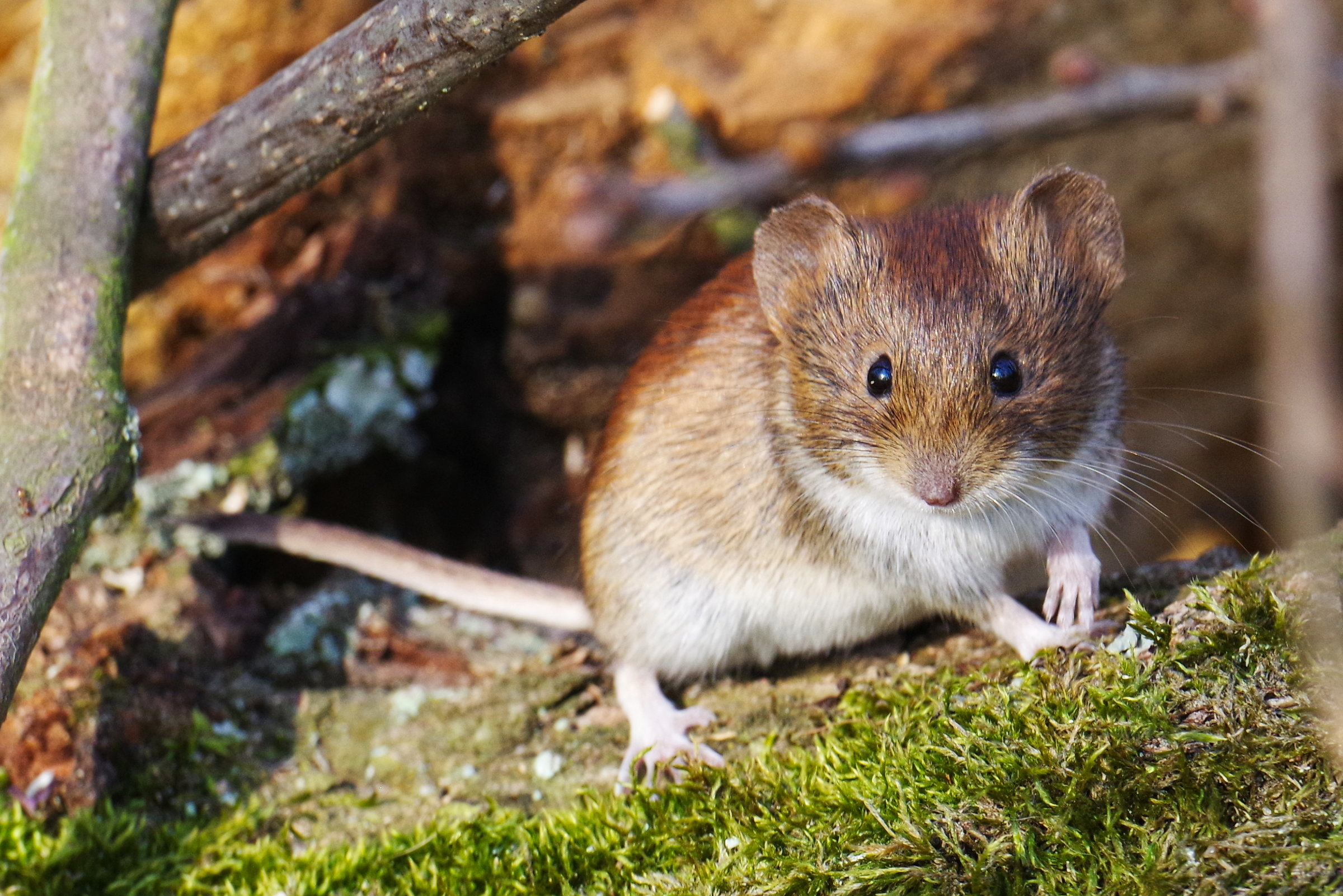
Bank vole

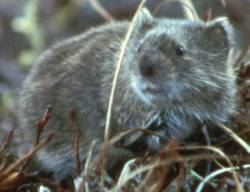
Tundra vole

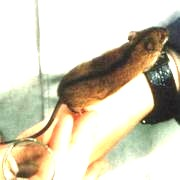
Striped field mouse

Rodents make up the largest order of mammals, with over 40% of mammalian species. They have two incisors in the upper and lower jaw which grow continually and must be kept short by gnawing. Most rodents are small though the capybara can weigh up to 45 kg (99 lb).

- Suborder: Sciurognathi
  - Family: Castoridae (beavers)
    - Genus: Castor
      - American beaver, C. canadensis LC introduced
      - European beaver, C. fiber LC
  - Family: Sciuridae (squirrels)
    - Subfamily: Sciurinae
      - Tribe: Sciurini
        - Genus: Sciurus
          - Red squirrel, Sciurus vulgaris LC
      - Tribe: Pteromyini
        - Genus: Pteromys
          - Siberian flying squirrel, Pteromys volans LC
  - Family: Gliridae (dormice)
    - Subfamily: Leithiinae
      - Genus: Eliomys
        - Garden dormouse, Eliomys quercinus NT
  - Family: Dipodidae (jerboas)
    - Subfamily: Sicistinae
      - Genus: Sicista
        - Northern birch mouse, Sicista betulina LC
  - Family: Cricetidae
    - Subfamily: Arvicolinae
      - Genus: Arvicola
        - Water vole, Arvicola amphibius LC
      - Genus: Clethrionomys
        - Bank vole, Clethrionomys glareolus LC
        - Grey red-backed vole, Clethrionomys rufocanus LC
        - Northern red-backed vole, Clethrionomys rutilus LC
      - Genus: Lemmus
        - Norway lemming, Lemmus lemmus LC
      - Genus: Microtus
        - Field vole, Microtus agrestis LC
        - Common vole, Microtus arvalis LC
        - Tundra vole, Microtus oeconomus LC
        - Southern vole, Microtus rossiaemeridionalis LC
      - Genus: Myopus
        - Wood lemming, Myopus schisticolor LC
  - Family: Muridae (mice, rats, voles, gerbils, hamsters, etc.)
    - Subfamily: Murinae
      - Genus: Apodemus
        - Striped field mouse, Apodemus agrarius LC
        - Yellow-necked mouse, Apodemus flavicollis LC
      - Genus: Micromys
        - Harvest mouse, Micromys minutus LC

== Order: Lagomorpha (lagomorphs) ==
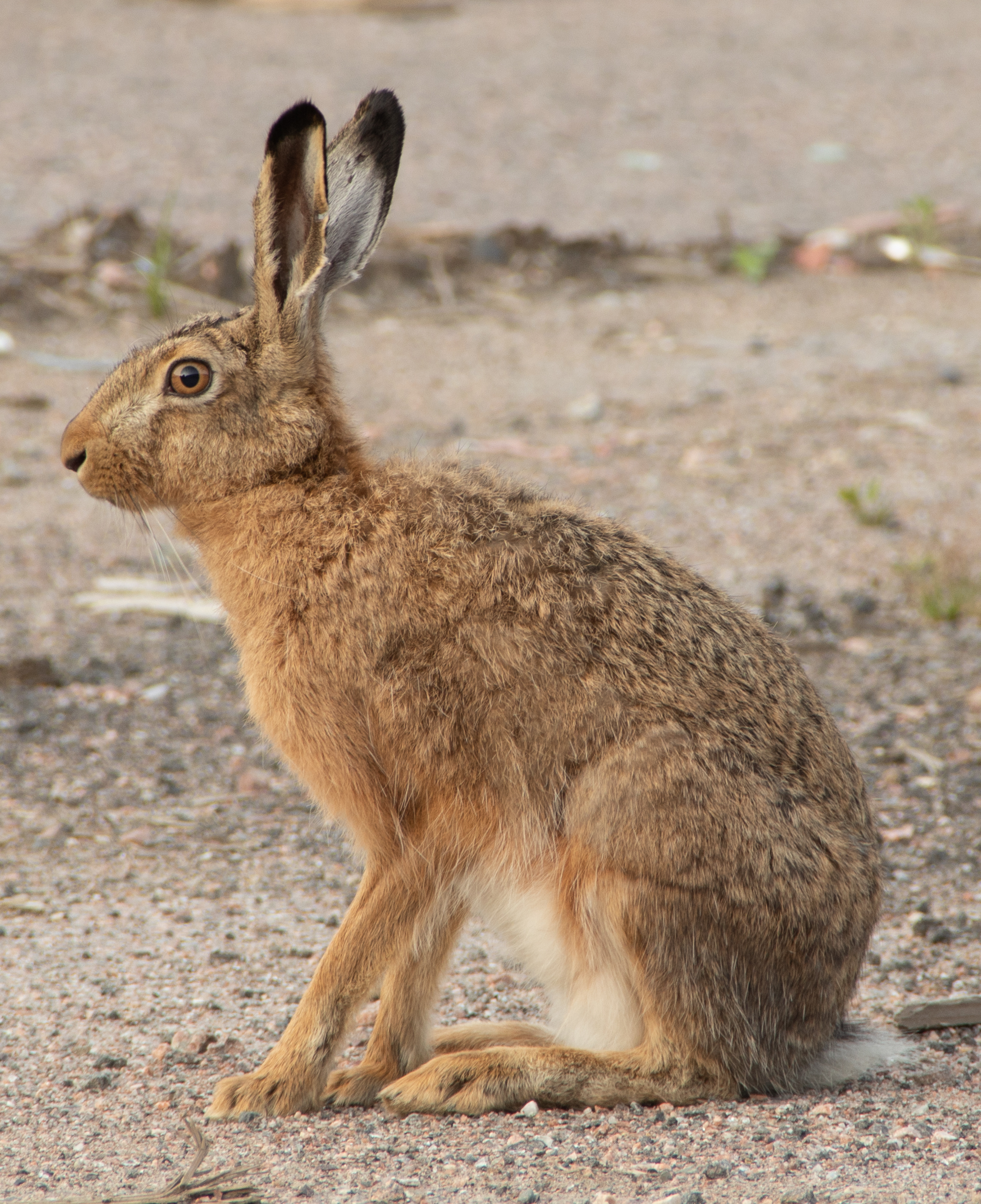
European hare

The lagomorphs comprise two families, Leporidae (hares and rabbits), and Ochotonidae (pikas). Though they can resemble rodents, and were classified as a superfamily in that order until the early twentieth century, they have since been considered a separate order. They differ from rodents in a number of physical characteristics, such as having four incisors in the upper jaw rather than two.

- Family: Leporidae (rabbits, hares)
  - Genus: Lepus
    - European hare, L. europaeus NT
    - Mountain hare, L. timidus LC

== Order: Eulipotyphla (hedgehogs, shrews and moles) ==
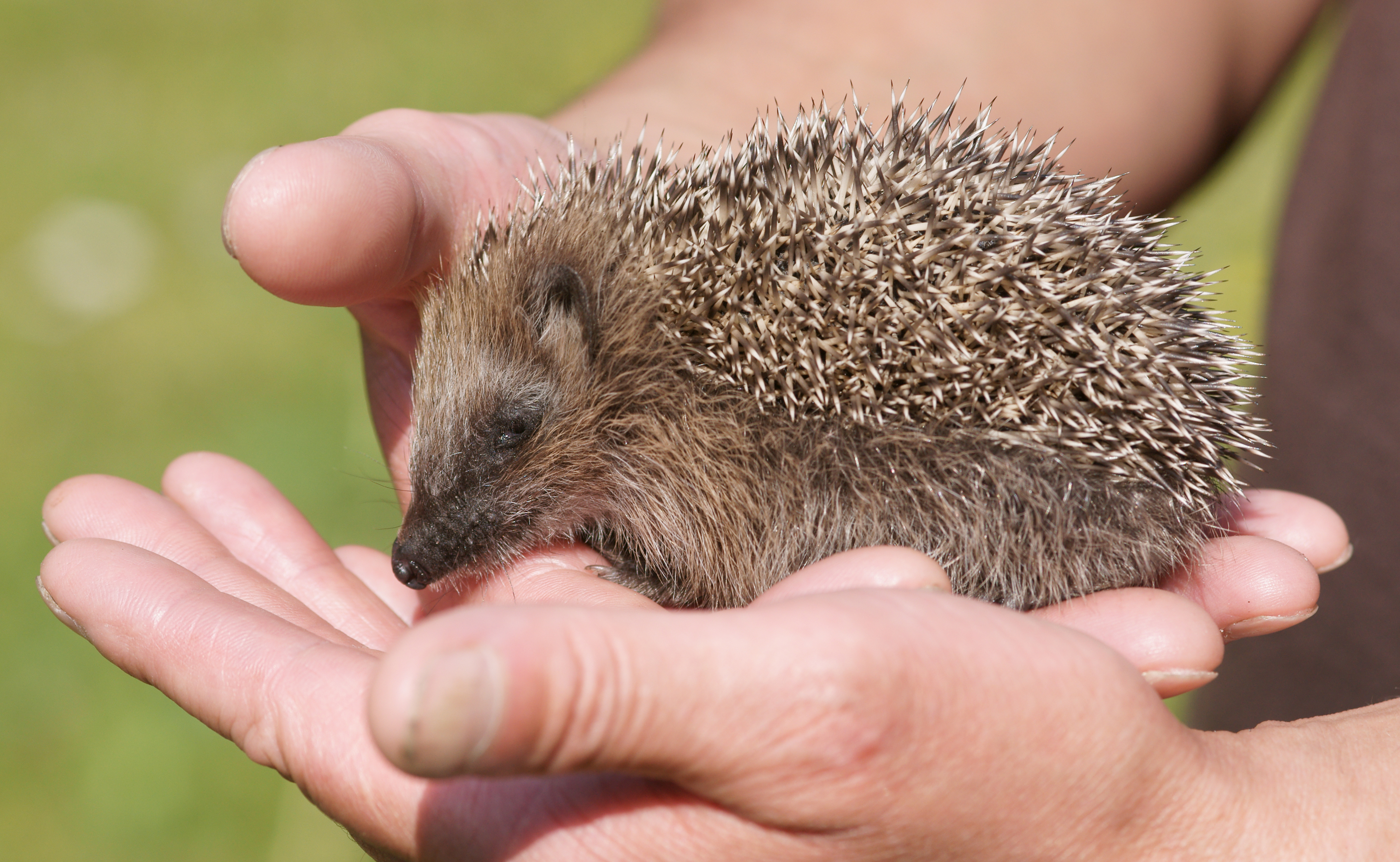
West European hedgehog

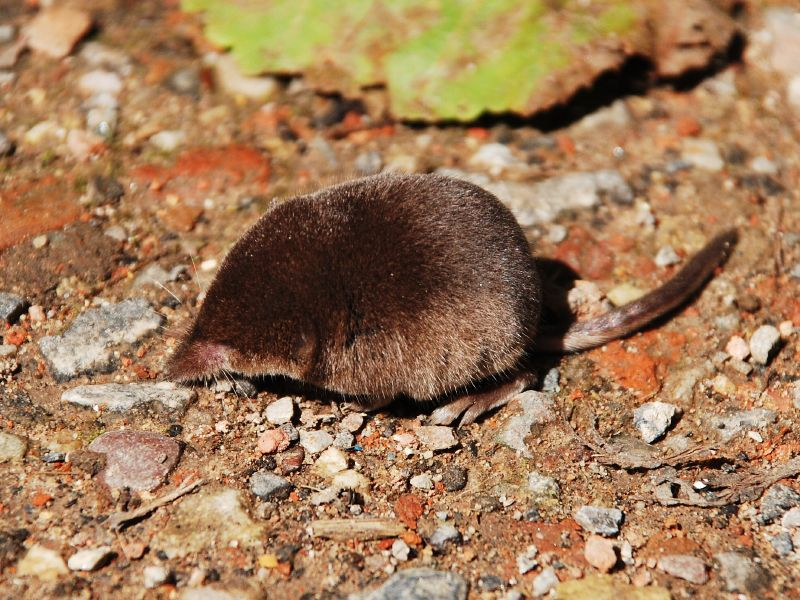
Eurasian pygmy shrew

Hedgehogs are easily recognised by their spines, shrews closely resemble mice, and moles are stout-bodied burrowers.

- Family: Erinaceidae (hedgehogs)
  - Subfamily: Erinaceinae
    - Genus: Erinaceus
      - West European hedgehog, Erinaceus europaeus NT
- Family: Soricidae (shrews)
  - Subfamily: Crocidurinae
    - Genus: Crocidura
      - Lesser white-toothed shrew, Crocidura suaveolens LC
  - Subfamily: Soricinae
    - Tribe: Nectogalini
      - Genus: Neomys
        - Eurasian water shrew, Neomys fodiens LC
    - Tribe: Soricini
      - Genus: Sorex
        - Common shrew, Sorex araneus LC
        - Laxmann's shrew, Sorex caecutiens LC
        - Taiga shrew, Sorex isodon LC
        - Eurasian least shrew, Sorex minutissimus LC
        - Eurasian pygmy shrew, Sorex minutus LC
- Family: Talpidae (moles)
  - Subfamily: Talpinae
    - Tribe: Talpini
      - Genus: Talpa
        - European mole, Talpa europaea LC

== Order: Chiroptera (bats) ==
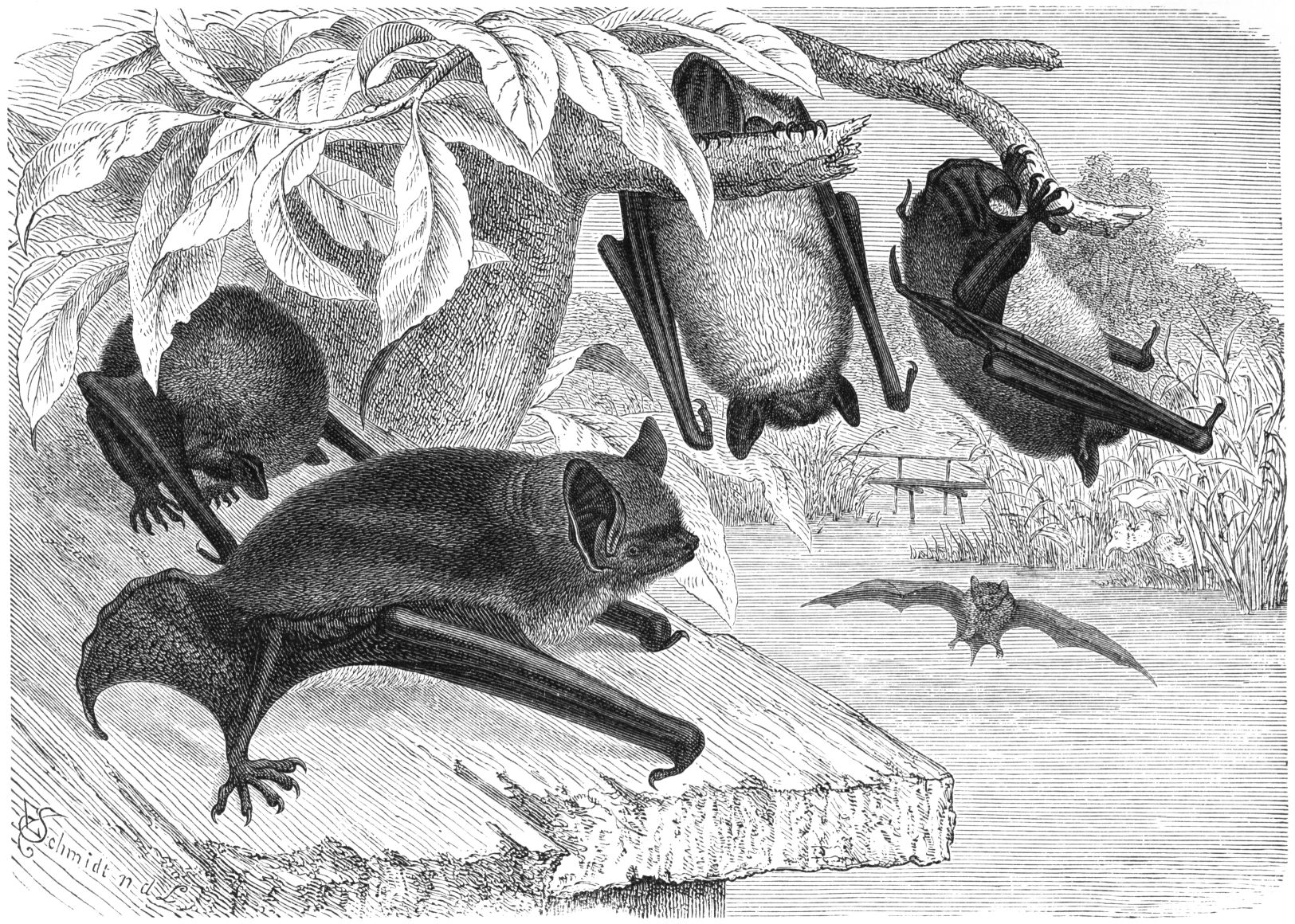
Daubenton's bat

The bats' most distinguishing feature is that their forelimbs are developed as wings, making them the only mammals capable of flight. Bat species account for about 20% of all mammals.

- Family: Vespertilionidae
  - Subfamily: Myotinae
    - Genus: Myotis
      - Daubenton's bat, Myotis daubentonii LC
      - Whiskered bat, Myotis mystacinus LC
      - Natterer's bat, Myotis nattereri LC
  - Subfamily: Vespertilioninae
    - Genus: Eptesicus
      - Northern bat, Eptesicus nilssoni LC
    - Genus: Plecotus
      - Brown long-eared bat, P. auritus LC
    - Genus: Vespertilio
      - Parti-coloured bat, Vespertilio murinus LC
- Family: Molossidae
  - Genus: Tadarida
    - European free-tailed bat, Tadarida teniotis LC

== Order: Cetacea (whales) ==
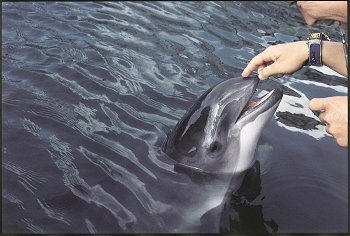
Harbour porpoise

The order Cetacea includes whales, dolphins and porpoises. They are the mammals most fully adapted to aquatic life with a spindle-shaped nearly hairless body, protected by a thick layer of blubber, and forelimbs and tail modified to provide propulsion underwater.

- Suborder: Mysticeti
  - Family: Balaenidae (right whales)
    - Genus: Balaena
      - North Atlantic right whale, Eubalaena glacialis CR or functionally extinct in Eastern Atlantic
  - Family: Balaenopteridae
    - Subfamily: Balaenopterinae
      - Genus: Balaenoptera
        - Fin whale, Balaenoptera physalus VU
        - Common minke whale, Balaenoptera acutorostrata LC
    - Subfamily: Megapterinae
      - Genus: Megaptera
        - Humpback whale, Megaptera novaeangliae LC
- Suborder: Odontoceti
  - Family: Phocoenidae
    - Genus: Phocoena
      - Harbour porpoise, Phocoena phocoena LC
  - Family: Monodontidae
    - Genus: Delphinapterus
      - Beluga, Delphinapterus leucas LC
  - Family: Ziphidae
    - Genus: Mesoplodon
      - Sowerby's beaked whale, Mesoplodon bidens LC
  - Family: Delphinidae (marine dolphins)
    - Genus: Lagenorhynchus
      - White-beaked dolphin, Lagenorhynchus albirostris LC
    - Genus: Tursiops
      - Common bottlenose dolphin, Tursiops truncatus LC
      - Genus: Grampus
        - Risso's dolphin, Grampus griseus LC
      - Genus: Orcinus
        - Orca, Orcinus orca DD

== Order: Carnivora (carnivorans) ==
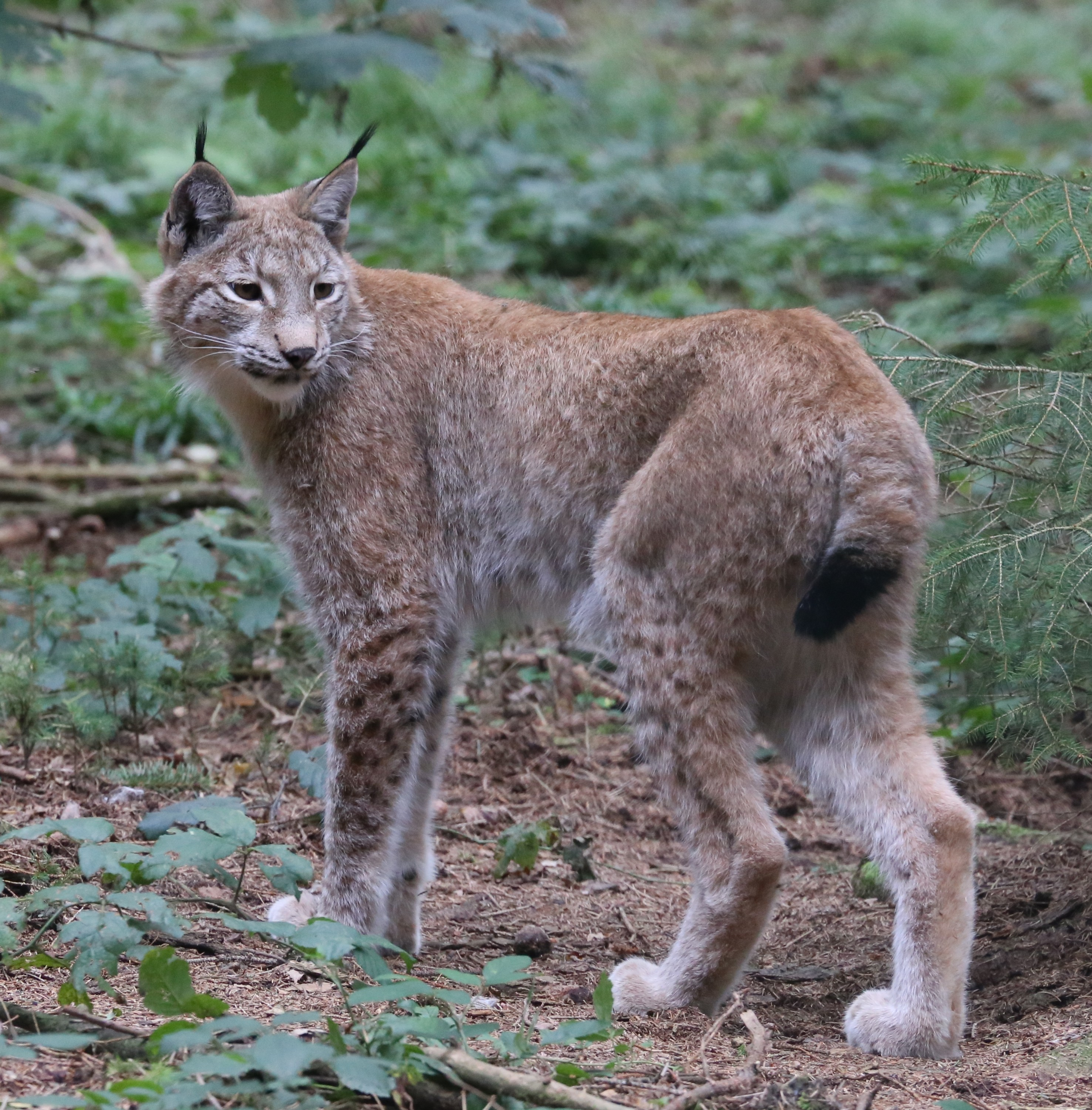
Northern Eurasian lynx

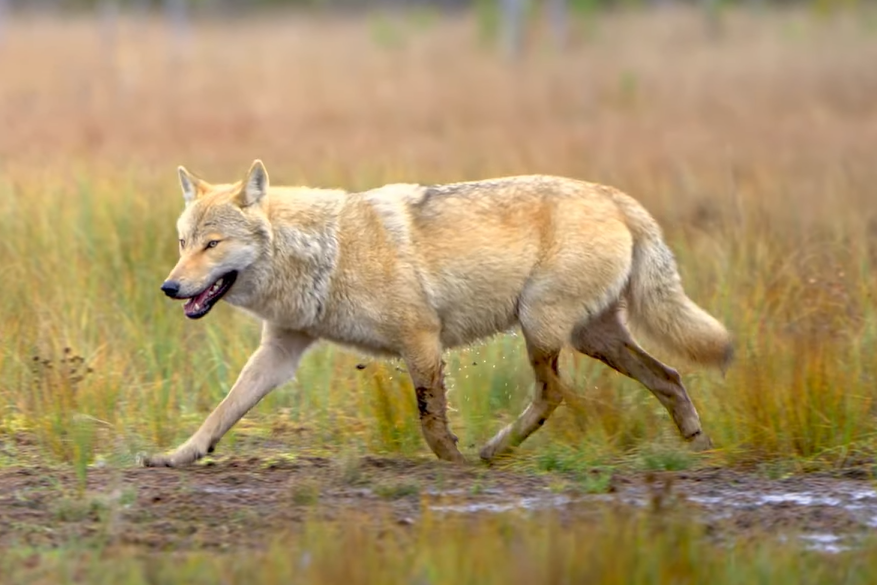
Eurasian gray wolf

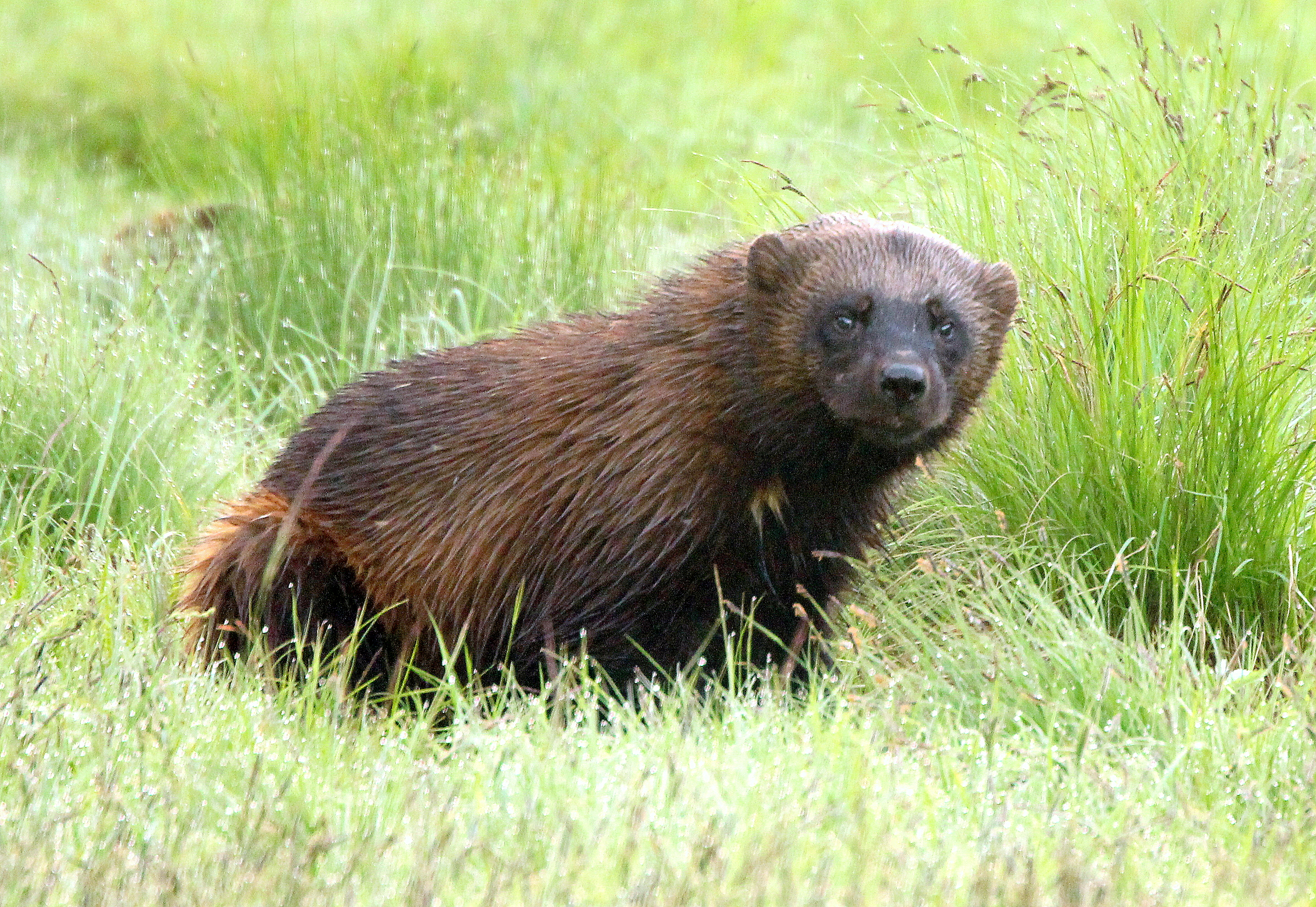
Wolverine

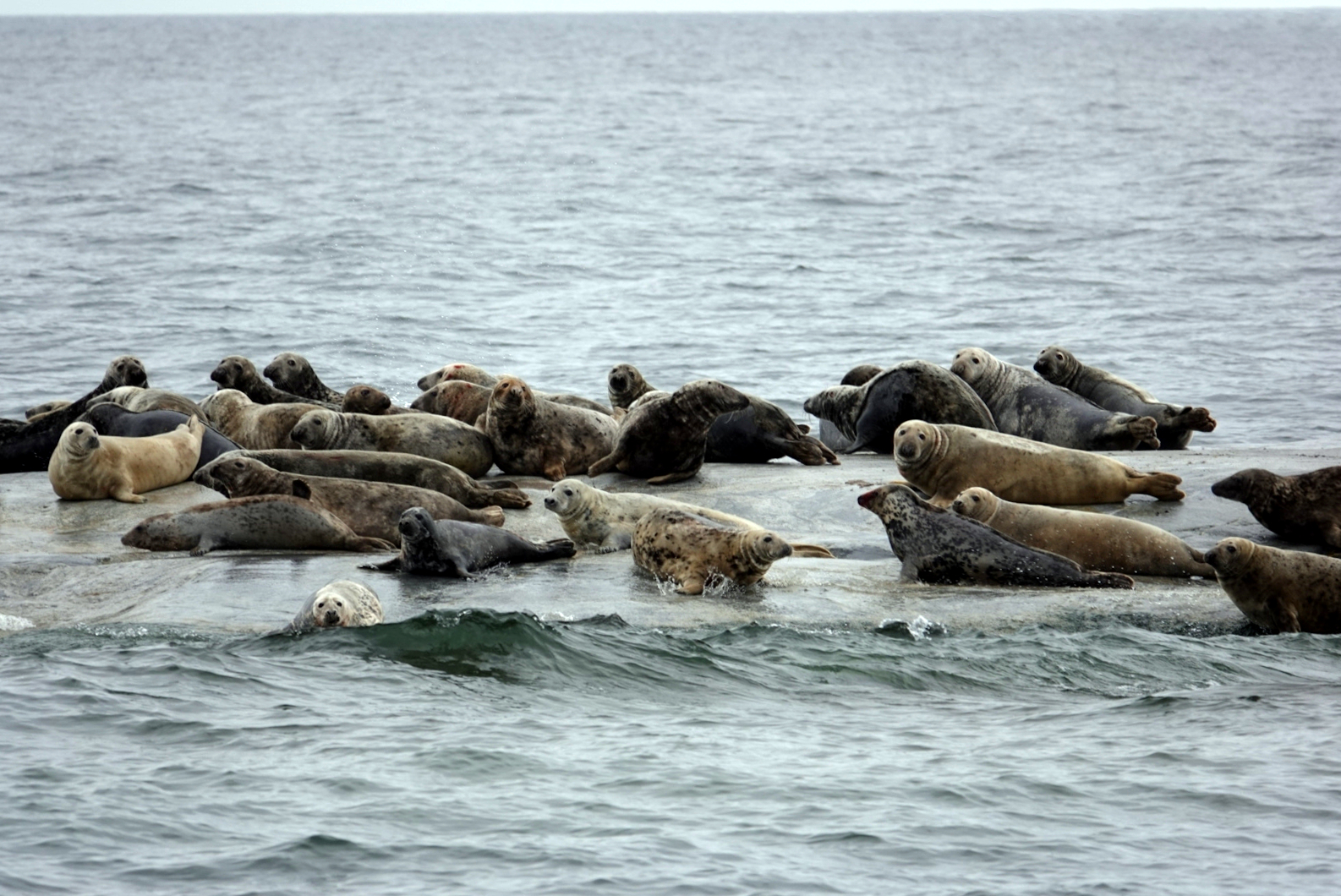
Grey seals

There are over 260 species of carnivorans, the majority of which feed primarily on meat. They have a characteristic skull shape and dentition.

- Suborder: Feliformia
  - Family: Felidae (cats)
    - Subfamily: Felinae
      - Genus: Lynx
        - Eurasian lynx, Lynx lynx LC
- Suborder: Caniformia
  - Family: Canidae (dogs, foxes)
    - Genus: Canis
      - Gray wolf, Canis lupus LC
    - Genus: Nyctereutes
      - Raccoon dog, Nyctereutes procyonoides LC introduced
    - Genus: Vulpes
      - Arctic fox, Vulpes lagopus LC
      - Red fox, Vulpes vulpes LC
  - Family: Ursidae (bears)
    - Genus: Ursus
      - Brown bear, Ursus arctos LC
  - Family: Mustelidae (mustelids)
    - Genus: Gulo
      - Wolverine, Gulo gulo LC
    - Genus: Lutra
      - European otter, Lutra lutra NT
    - Genus: Martes
      - Pine marten, Martes martes LC
    - Genus: Meles
      - European badger, Meles meles LC
    - Genus: Mustela
      - Stoat, Mustela erminea LC
      - European mink, Mustela lutreola CR extirpated
      - Least weasel, Mustela nivalis LC
      - European polecat, Mustela putorius LC
    - Genus: Neogale
      - American mink, N. vison LC introduced
  - Family: Odobenidae
    - Genus: Odobenus
      - Walrus, Odobenus rosmarus VU
  - Family: Phocidae (earless seals)
    - Genus: Halichoerus
      - Grey seal, Halichoerus grypus LC
    - Genus: Pagophilus
      - Harp seal, Pagophilus groenlandicus NT
    - Genus: Pusa
      - Ringed seal, Pusa hispida LC

== Order: Artiodactyla (even-toed ungulates) ==
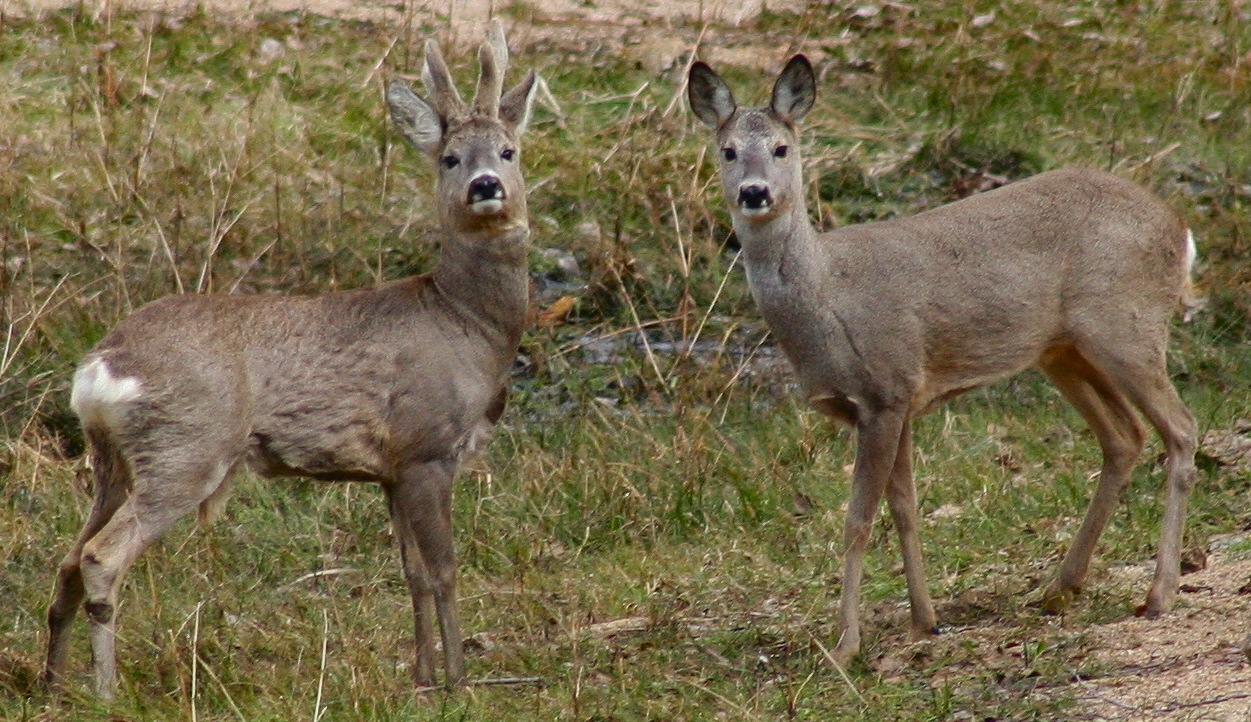
Roe deer

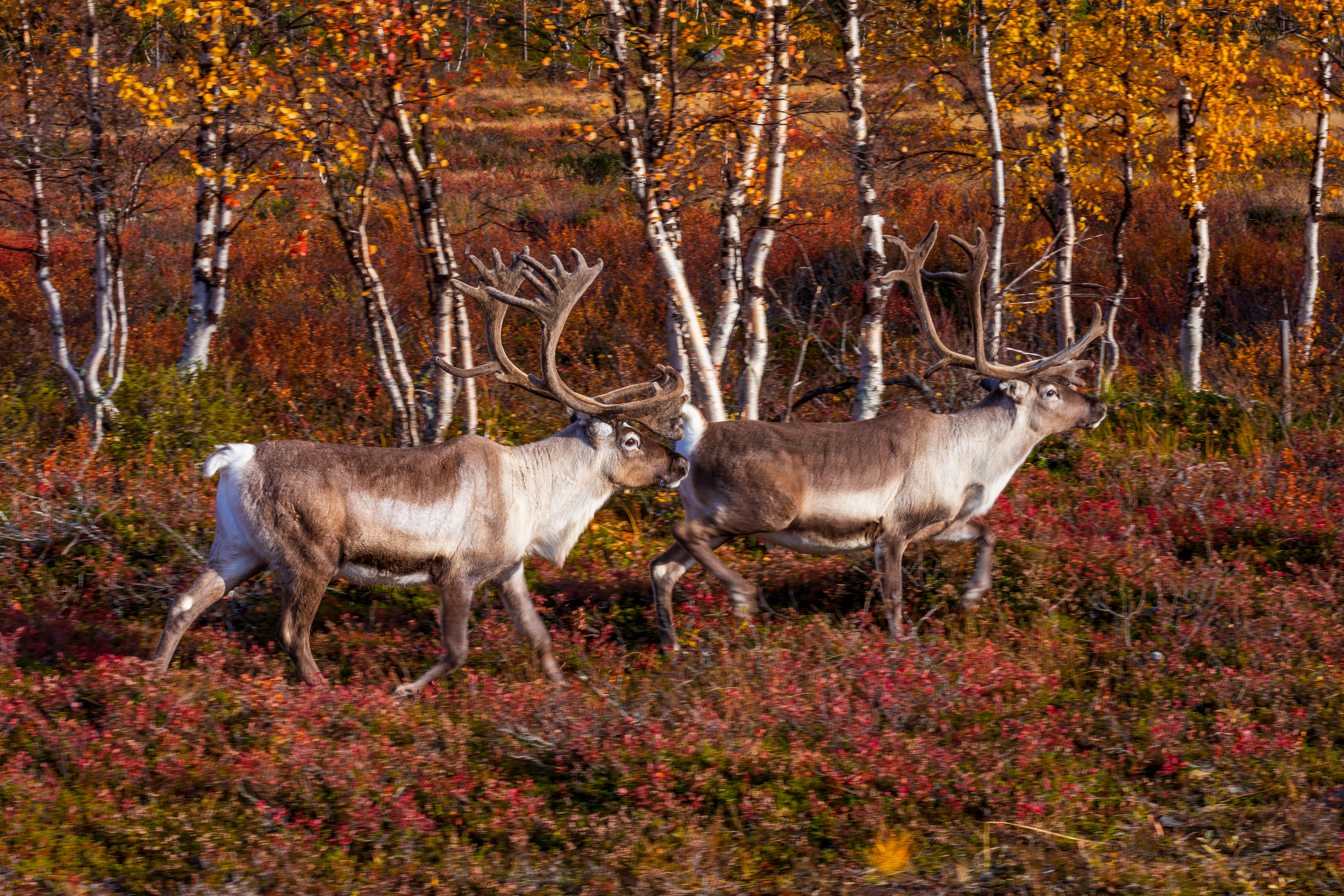
Reindeer

The even-toed ungulates are ungulates whose weight is borne about equally by the third and fourth toes, rather than mostly or entirely by the third as in perissodactyls. There are about 220 artiodactyl species, including many that are of great economic importance to humans.

- Family: Bovidae (bovids)
  - Subfamily: Bovidae
    - Genus: Bison
      - European bison, B. bonasus NT extirpated
- Family: Suidae (pigs)
  - Subfamily: Suinae
    - Genus: Sus
      - Wild boar, S. scrofa LC
- Family: Cervidae (deer)
  - Subfamily: Capreolinae
    - Genus: Alces
      - Moose, A. alces LC
    - Genus: Capreolus
      - Roe deer, C. capreolus LC
    - Genus: Odocoileus
      - White-tailed deer, O. virginianus LC introduced
    - Genus: Rangifer
      - Reindeer, R. tarandus VU
  - Subfamily: Cervinae
    - Genus: Dama
      - Fallow deer, D. dama LC introduced

== See also ==
- Fauna of Finland
- List of chordate orders
- Lists of mammals by region
- List of prehistoric mammals
- Mammal classification
- List of mammals described in the 2000s
