= Shinto shrew =

Conservation status
- Least Concern (IUCN 3.1)

Scientific classification
- Kingdom: Animalia
- Phylum: Chordata
- Class: Mammalia
- Order: Eulipotyphla
- Family: Soricidae
- Genus: Sorex
- Species: S. shinto

Binomial name
- Sorex shinto Thomas, 1905

Subspecies
- Sorex shinto sadonis; Sorex shinto shikokensis; Sorex shinto shinto
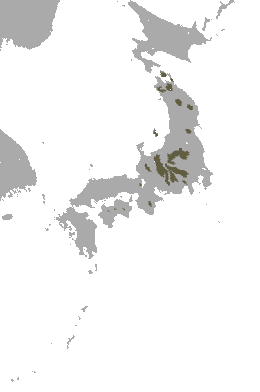
- Shinto shrew range

Species of mammal

The Shinto shrew (Sorex shinto) is a species of shrew of the genus Sorex that lives only on the islands of Japan. It is a mole-like mammal with a pointed snout, very small ears, and a relatively long tail. Like most shrews, it is tiny, has poor eyesight, and a very good sense of hearing and smell which it uses to locate its prey, mainly insects.

At one time, the Shinto shrew was classified as a subspecies of Sorex caecutiens, or Laxmann's shrew, however as scientists collected new data on these shrews, such as genetic testing, it was decided that they should be classified as a separate species.

There are three distinct populations of Shinto shrew living on the islands of Japan. Living as isolated groups on their respective islands prevents the populations from interbreeding and can allow variations to develop between the groups over time. Because of these differences, the three groups have been classified as subspecies of S. shinto. Those living on Sado Island are S. shinto sadonis, those living on Shikoku Island are S. shinto shikokensis, and those living on Japan's main island of Honshu are S. shinto shinto.

== Genetics ==
Shinto shrew karyotype comprises diploid number of 42 chromosomes, the same as in the case of Laxmann's shrew. A fundamental number equals to 66, as in the case of Laxmann's shrew from Hokkaido. Pairs from 1 to 9 are big metacentric or submetacentric chromosomes, and were numerated according to their size. Thus, the chromosome of 1st and 2nd pair are the biggest. They are metacentric and can't be discerned morphologically. A 4th pair is metacentric too. On the other side, pairs 3, 5 and 8 are submetacentric. Consecutive 9 pairs comprise telocentric chromosomes. Ones belonging to pairs from 10 to 12 are greater than others, with relatively bigger short arms. A 16th pair is submetacentric too, in contrast to telocentric pairs 17 and 19. A satellites can be found in 17th pair and, more pronounced, in 20th pair, in the end of p arm. The satellites function as active NOR. Description of chromosomes is nearly precisely the same in long-clawed shrew, besides some local differences in the later. Authors emphasize genetic proximity of shinto and Laxmann's shrews. X chromosome resembles a homological one of Cheju Island Laxmann's shrew according to G stripes. A kariotype observed in the shinto and Laxmann's shrews is thought to be ancestral for all Laxmann's shrew species group.

== Morphology ==
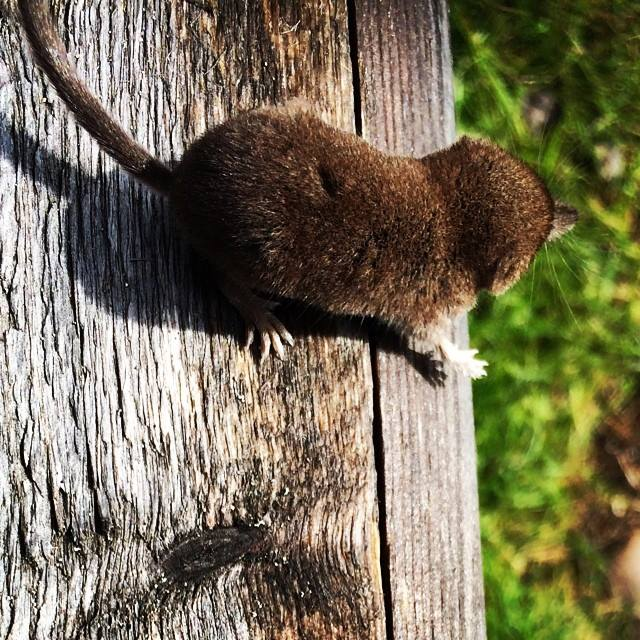
In general appearance the shinto shrew looks similar to Laxmann's shrew

In general appearance the shinto shrew looks similar to Laxmann's shrew. However, it is smaller than Laxmann's shrew, but larger than Azumi shrew. The Shinto shrew's head and body measure between 5.1 and 7.25 cm (2.01 and 2.85 in). Its tail reaches from 4.4 to 5.7 cm (1.7 to 2.2 in), which makes its smaller than in Azumi shrew. The head length from incisors to occipital condyles is 1.65 to 1.81 cm (0.65 to 0.71 in), and its teeth rows measure from 3.9 to 4.4 mm (0.15 to 0.17 in). Its hind foot is 1.14 to 1.36 cm (0.45 to 0.54 in). It weighs between 4.1 and 6.2 g (0.14 and 0.22 oz).

Dorsum is gray-brown.

The Shinto shrew resembles Laxmann's shrew. Traits of the shinto shrew from Honshu gradually comes into traits of Laxmann's shrew from Primorsky Krai and Corea (head size) and from Sacchalin and Hokkaido (external measures). However, the aforementioned species can be distinguished even by the surface of 4th superior premolar. Only recognition of the subspecies Sorex s. sadonis is problematic.

== Systematics ==
The shinto shrew was described by Oldfield Thomas in 1905, who pointed out the village Makado (now part of small town Noheji) in Aomori Prefecture, northern Hondo (former name of Honshu), Japan as a type locality. However, the shinto shrew was not announced as a separate species, but as a subspecies of Laxmann's shrew, a shrew species common in Asia and of wide range and numerous described subspecies. Nowadays, the shinto shrew and Laxmann's shrew are considered different species, although closely related, which was proved by genetic research. According to some authors a difference in appearance of these species is not evident. Other studies, based on genetics, recognize them as separate species belonging to the same species group and of common ancestry. The group is called caecutiens/shinto species group. The third species closely related to the two mentioned before is the Chinese shrew. The trio with taiga shrew and long-clawed shrew make up the caecutiens species group. It is, among few other species group and species that belong to no species group, classified in the Sorex subgenus, one of the subgenera of genus Sorex. That genus belongs to the tribe Soricini, which, together with the tribes Blarinini, Blarinellini, Anourosoricini, Notiosoricini, and Nectogalini, creates the Soricinae subfamily, one of three subfamilies of the Soricid family, next to Crocidurinae and Myosoricinae.

A cladogram according to Naitoh et al,. 2005

- Sorex shinto
- Sorex caecutiens

Nowadays, 3 subspecies are recognized:

- Sorex shinto shinto Thomas, 1905;
- Sorex shinto sadonis Yoshiyuki & Imaizumi, 1986;
- Sorex shinto shikokensis Abe, 1967.

Sorex s. shinto is limited to the high mountain areas in central Honshu, while Sorex s. sadonis can only be found from the lowlands to the highest mountains (896 m) in the Northern part of Sado Island. Sorex s. shikokensis only lives in the Ishizuchi and Tsurugi mountain systems of Kyushu.

The three subspecies are slightly different in size. Sorex s. shinto is the lightest with a body weight of around 5.2 g (0.18 oz), while Sorex s. sadonis and Sorex s. shikokensis are heavier with around 6.2 g (0.22 oz).

According to some authors, Sorey s. sadonis can not be genetically distinguished from the nominate subspecies and it could appear recently. Other authors point out its genetic separateness from the Honshu and Shikoku populations. What is more, few researched individuals do not fit the former nor the latter group, such ones are classified as Sorey s. shikokensis.

Another subspecies Sorex s. chouei was previously described, but it seems to be a junior synonym of Sorex s. shinto. Sorex s. saevus described by Thomas, 1907 from Sakhalin, is nowadays recognized as synonym of long-clawed shrew.

== Behaviour and life cycle ==
Soricids usually lead a solitary life. There is no research concerning this area in the case of the shinto shrew. It lives on the ground, in the leaf litter. The majority of caught specimens was active nightly, but at high altitude activity occurred daily.

A female copulates with a male and becomes pregnant. Gravid females of the Sorex shinto shinto subspecies were met on Honshu in May and June. Pregnant Sorex shinto sadonis females were observed from March to May. The female gives birth to from one to six young in the case of the nominate species and from four to six in the case of the Sorex shinto sadonis subspecies.

Soricids usually do not live long. One generation is estimated to 1 year.

== Distribution ==
The shinto shrew is endemic to Japan. It lives on Honshu (Kii Peninsula), Shikoku, and Sado Islands. The nominative subspecies dwells in northern and central mountain areas on Honshu, at middle and high altitude. Sorex shinto shikokensis lives on Shikoku, more precisely in Ishizuchi and Tsurugi Mountains. Aforementioned Sado Island is home of the Sorex shinto sadonis subspecies, which is also observed on the western Honshu seashore, not only in the mountains, but also in lower regions.

Shinto shrew fossils dated to the Pleistocene were found on Honshu and ones from the late Pleistocene on Kyushu. The shinto shrew is sympatric with Laxmann's shrew.

== Ecology ==
The habitats of shinto shrews are primary and secondary forests, especially coniferous, and shrubland. It can be observed in lower altitudes, even at sea level, however, it is more frequently met in mountains, where it can reach 2,900 m above sea level. At sea level it lives on Honshu, its maximum altitude on that island is 1,200 m. On Shikoku it dwells from 0 to 900 m. On Sado Island it was met on 300 m above sea level.

There is no specific data concerning diet of the shinto shrew. The closely related Laxmann's shrew eats spiders, beetles, Oniscidea and caterpillars.

The main predators of the Shinto shrew in Ishikawa Prefecture on Honshu are ermines, Japanese marten, and red fox. Additionally, the Japanese mamushi (a pitviper species) feeds on these shrews.

Parasites of the shinto shrew can be nematodes, such as Parastrongyloides winchesi and Syphacia, probably Syphacia emileromani, however in the latter case the shrews were probably accidental hosts of mice parasites after consumption of its carcass.

== Status and conservation ==
The population trend is table. IUCN does not give data concerning population number. In some places the shinto shrew is abundant, like northern and central Honshu, where, as highlighted by IUCN, the Izumi shrew does not occur, and on Sado Island. On the other hand, on Shikoku the shinto shrew is rare and can be found only in high latitudes. It is sympatric with the Izumi shrew on Honshu. A large part of the shinto shrew area is protected. IUCN does not mention any threats and classifies the shinto shrew as a species of least concern (LC).
