= Smith's vole =

Conservation status
- Least Concern (IUCN 3.1)

Scientific classification
- Kingdom: Animalia
- Phylum: Chordata
- Class: Mammalia
- Infraclass: Placentalia
- Order: Rodentia
- Family: Cricetidae
- Subfamily: Arvicolinae
- Genus: Craseomys
- Species: C. smithii

Binomial name
- Craseomys smithii (Thomas, 1905)

Synonyms
- Eothenomys smithii (Thomas, 1905); Myodes smithii (Thomas, 1905); Phaulomys smithii (Thomas, 1905)

Species of rodent

Smith's vole (Craseomys smithii) is a species of rodent in the family Cricetidae. It is also known as Smith's red-backed vole and is found only in Japan.

This vole is named after Richard Gordon Smith, (1858–1918) who, after falling out with his wife, traveled the world hunting for animals and keeping a record of his travels and discoveries in eight large leather-bound diaries. He spent some time in Japan where he collected mammals for the British Museum, including the type specimen of this vole.

== Taxonomy ==
There has been considerable discussion as to the phylogeny of this species. The molars grow continually during the animal's life and because of this trait, it was at one time placed in the genus Phaulomys. However, studies using mitochondrial and nuclear ribosomal DNA have shown that it is closely related to the Japanese and Asian species, Craseomys rufocanus, and the Korean species, Craseomys regulus and that there is no support for its inclusion in Phaulomys. The ever-growing molars in C. smithii are now believed to be independently derived from a rooted Craseomys ancestor endemic to Japan. Phaulomys is now considered a subgenus of Craseomys, and contains this species, the Japanese C. andersoni, and the Korean C. regulus, although the exact taxonomy remains unsettled.

== Distribution ==
Smith's vole is found on the Japanese islands of Dogo, Honshu, Kyushu and Shikoku. On Honshu, it is found across the central and southern part of the island, but absent from the northern part.

== Description ==
The color of Smith's vole varies from brownish-yellow to mid brown with the underparts a paler shade of brown. The body length is about 115 millimetres with a tail about 60 millimetres. The weight varies between 20 and 35 g (0.71 and 1.23 oz). The fur is dense and short, the muzzle blunt and the ears rounded. The dental formula is 1.0.0.31.0.0.3 and the molars grow continuously throughout life.

== Ecology ==
Smith's vole lives in forests, plantations and farmland in montane areas above about 400 metres. It is absent from alluvial plains. It makes burrows in leaf litter and prefers damp conditions. It is a common species in chosen habitat but some of its populations are fragmented by road development, land reclamation, dam building and deforestation. The diet is entirely vegetarian and it feeds on the stems and leaves of green plants and on seeds. The breeding season varies in different locations and there may be one or two litters per year, each of one to six young, but usually two or three.
