= Shansei vole =

Conservation status
- Least Concern (IUCN 3.1)

Scientific classification
- Kingdom: Animalia
- Phylum: Chordata
- Class: Mammalia
- Order: Rodentia
- Family: Cricetidae
- Subfamily: Arvicolinae
- Genus: Craseomys
- Species: C. shanseius

Binomial name
- Craseomys shanseius (Thomas, 1908)

Species of rodent

The Shansei vole (Craseomys shanseius) is a species of rodent in the family Cricetidae. It is found only in north-central China where its habitat is forests.

== Taxonomy ==
The Shansei vole was first described in 1908 as Myodes shanseius by the British zoologist Oldfield Thomas, the type locality being Chao Cheng Shan in Shanxi Province. It is often regarded as a subspecies of the grey red-backed vole (Craseomys rufocanus). However the molar teeth in adults do not have roots which sets it apart from that species and tends to associate it with Eothenomys species, though the fur length, texture and colour pattern are more like Craseomys and Clethrionomys than Eothenomys. The Shansei vole is allopatric to the royal vole (Craseomys regulus) of the Korean peninsula with which it forms a species complex.

== Description ==
The Shansei vole is similar in appearance to the grey red-backed vole but the reddish-coloured back is rather less rufous and the grey sides are more of an ochre-grey. The underparts are greyish-buff and the tail is brown above and white below. The upper surfaces of the feet are brownish-white. The eyes are small and the ears are small and rounded. The molar teeth do not have roots in adults, a fact that distinguishes this vole from the grey red-backed vole. The Shansei vole has a head-and-body length of 105 mm (4.1 in) and a tail length of 25 to 30 mm (1.0 to 1.2 in).

== Distribution and habitat ==
The Shansei vole is endemic to China where it occurs in the southern part of Gansu, northern part of Sichuan, northern part of Shanxi, northern part of and in the provinces of Shaanxi, Hebei, Beijing, Inner Mongolia, Henan and Hubei. It is usually found in woodland and forests.

== Behaviour ==
The Shansei vole is largely nocturnal. Its diet consists mainly of grasses, green leaves and stems, and to a lesser extent it feeds on seeds.

== Status ==
The Shansei vole has a wide range and is assumed to have a large total population. It is present in several national nature reserves. The population trend is unknown, but no specific threats have been identified and the International Union for Conservation of Nature has assessed its conservation status as being of "least concern".
