= Malcolm Playfair Anderson =

American zoologist and explorer

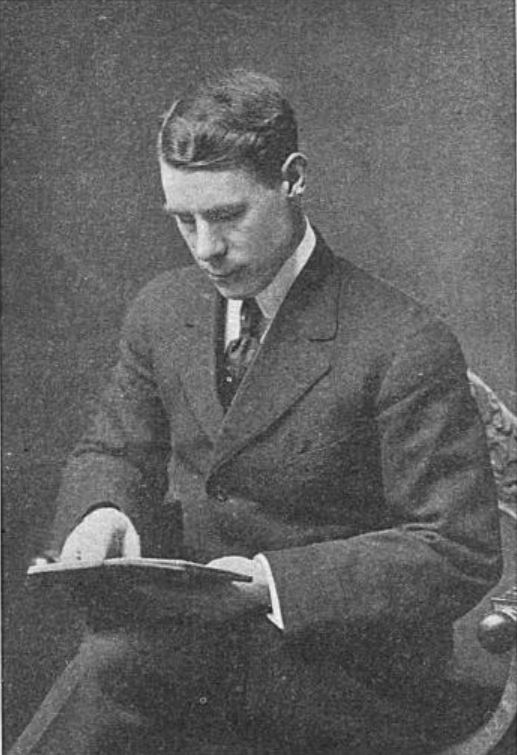
- Born: April 6, 1879; Irvington, Indiana, US
- Died: February 21, 1919 (aged 39); Oakland, California, US
- Resting place: Chapel of the Chimes (Oakland, California)
- Known for: Scientific collection
- Scientific career
- Fields: Zoology

Malcolm Playfair Anderson (6 April 1879 – 21 February 1919) was an American zoologist and explorer. Anderson took part in numerous scientific expeditions and was chosen in 1904 to lead the Duke of Bedford's Exploration of Eastern Asia.

== Early life ==
Anderson was born 6 April 1879 in Irvington, Indiana to Melville Best Anderson and his wife Charlena (née van Vleck). Anderson was one of his parents' two children who survived to adulthood; the other was a younger brother, Robert van Vleck Anderson. From ages twelve to fourteen, Anderson attended school in Germany, where he was bullied by German schoolboys.

When he returned to the United States, Anderson began accompanying naturalists on scientific expeditions across the west. In 1893, at 14 years old, he aided William Wightman Price and Ray Lyman Wilbur on a collecting trip to Arizona, which was financed by Timothy Hopkins, one of the original trustees of Stanford University. As a teenager, he collected a considerable number of bird and mammal specimens through California, Alaska, Arizona, and British Columbia, and worked with notable naturalists including Joseph Grinnell.

Anderson enrolled in Stanford University, where his father was an English professor. He graduated in 1904 with a Bachelor of Arts in zoology.

== Career ==
In 1904, Anderson was chosen by the Zoological Society of London to lead Duke of Bedford's Exploration of Eastern Asia. While his interest was mostly in the study of birds, he was hired by Oldfield Thomas to procure new mammal specimens. The Exploration began in July 1904 in Yokohama, Japan. From 1904 to 1907, Anderson traveled through Japan, eastern China, and Korea.

In 1908, he took a break from scientific collecting, traveling Europe with his mother Charlena. The second leg of the expedition began in Wuhan on 5 October 1909 and ended in Shanghai on 13 September 1910. The Bedford Exploration of Eastern Asia collected over 2,700 individual mammals, resulting in many newly described species. Anderson collected the holotypes of several species, including the Shinto shrew and Japanese red-backed vole.

After completing the Exploration of Eastern Asia, Anderson took two collecting trips to South America. The first trip was with Wilfred Hudson Osgood, and the second was with his wife, Mary Elizabeth. He returned from the second trip "with health much impaired from the effects of fever."

In 1911, British zoologist Oldfield Thomas wrote: "To our great loss and regret, Mr Anderson now proposes to give up the arduous life of the field collector."

== Personal life ==
Anderson married Mary Elizabeth Gurnee, a distant cousin, on 15 June 1913. They had one son, Malcolm Gurnee Anderson, who died in infancy.

== Death ==
In response to the demands of World War I on American manufacturing, Anderson began working at a shipyard in 1918, as he was unable to join the Army. On 21 February 1919, Anderson died when he fell from the scaffolding at Moore's Shipyard in Oakland, California. Following his death, his father eulogized him in the scientific journal The Condor.

"His death is a loss not only to you, and to us, his friends, but to science. There are not many men with his ability and courage to go into hard places and do things worth doing, not in bravado, but simply in the course of his work."

— from a letter written to his father by a scientific friend and colleague (unidentified), quoted in his biography in The Auk.

== Species named in his honor ==
Several species were named in honor of Anderson, including:

- Japanese red-backed vole (Myodes andersoni)—Thomas, 1905
- Anderson's shrew mole (Uropsilus andersoni)—Thomas, 1911
- Anderson's white-bellied rat (Niviventer andersoni)—Thomas, 1911
- Anderson's four-eyed opossum (Philander andersoni)—Osgood, 1913
