= Imaizumi's red-backed vole =

Imaizumi's Red-backed Vole

Scientific classification
- Kingdom: Animalia
- Phylum: Chordata
- Class: Mammalia
- Order: Rodentia
- Family: Cricetidae
- Subfamily: Arvicolinae
- Genus: Craseomys
- Species: C. imaizumii

Binomial name
- Craseomys imaizumii (Jameson, 1961)

Species of rodent

Imaizumi's red-backed vole (Craseomys imaizumii) is a species of vole in the family Cricetidae. It is found in Japan and was initially designated as a subspecies of the Japanese red-backed vole, with studies of cranial and molar patterns supporting this. However, genetic tests in the late 1990s provide support for the theory that C. imaizumii is indeed a separate species, and it is now considered such pending the completion of more detailed studies.
