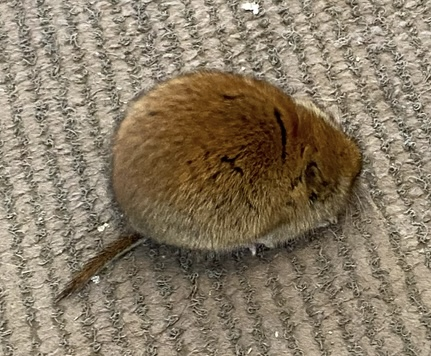

Conservation status
- Least Concern (IUCN 3.1)

Scientific classification
- Kingdom: Animalia
- Phylum: Chordata
- Class: Mammalia
- Order: Rodentia
- Family: Cricetidae
- Subfamily: Arvicolinae
- Genus: Craseomys
- Species: C. rex

Binomial name
- Craseomys rex (Imaizumi, 1971)

= Hokkaido red-backed vole =

Species of rodent

The Hokkaido red-backed vole (Craseomys rex) is a species of rodent in the family Cricetidae. It is found at high altitudes on the island of Hokkaido in Japan and at lower altitudes on some smaller islands nearby. Its natural habitat is temperate forests.

== Distribution ==
The Hokkaido red-backed vole occurs in the southwestern part of Hokkaido in the Hidaka Mountains, Daisetsuzan Volcanic Group, Teshio Mountains, and Kitami Mountains, and Shiribeshi Province, Oshima Subprefecture and Hiyama Subprefecture. It is also present at lower altitudes on the islands of Rishiri and Rebun, as well as Shikotan in the Kuril Islands and Shibotsu in the Habomai Islands. It is found in forests and is an adaptable species. Population genetic structuring is rather strong on Hokkaido, with different regions being characterised by different genetic lineages.

== Status ==
Despite having a total area of occupancy of less than 20,000 square kilometres (7,700 sq mi) and being considered rare, the Hokkaido red-backed vole is listed as being of "least concern" by the International Union for Conservation of Nature. This is because the population seems stable, the vole faces no significant threats and it is present in some protected areas.

== Further readings ==
- Musser, G. G.; Carleton, M. D. (2005). "Superfamily Muroidea". In Wilson, D. E.; Reeder, D. M. (eds.). Mammal Species of the World: A Taxonomic and Geographic Reference (3rd ed.). Johns Hopkins University Press. pp. 894–1531. ISBN 978-0-8018-8221-0. OCLC 62265494.
- Abramson, N. I.; Abramov, A. V.; Baranova, G. I. (2009). "New species of Red-Backed Vole (Mammalia: Rodentia: Cricetidae) in fauna of Russia: Molecular and morphologic evidences" (PDF). Proceedings of the Zoological Institute RAS. 313 (1): 3–9. doi:10.31610/trudyzin/2009.313.1.3.
