= Sado shrew =

Conservation status
- Endangered (IUCN 2.3)

Scientific classification
- Kingdom: Animalia
- Phylum: Chordata
- Class: Mammalia
- Order: Eulipotyphla
- Family: Soricidae
- Genus: Sorex
- Species: S. shinto
- Subspecies: S. s. sadonis

Trinomial name
- Sorex shinto sadonis Yoshiyuki & Imaizumi, 1986

Synonyms
- Sorex sadonis Yoshiyuki & Imaizumi, 1986

Subspecies of mammal

The Sado shrew (Sorex shinto sadonis) is a subspecies of mammal in the family Soricidae. It is endemic to Japan, and more specifically, the Japanese island of Sado. Although it is sometimes referred to as its own species, more recent scholarship identifies it as a subspecies of the Shinto shrew. However, there are significant morphological differences between the species.
