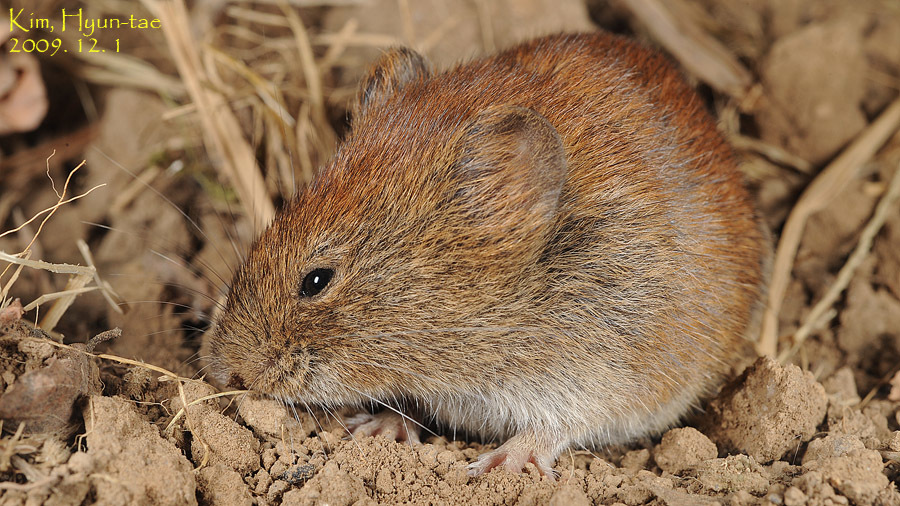

Conservation status
- Least Concern (IUCN 3.1)

Scientific classification
- Kingdom: Animalia
- Phylum: Chordata
- Class: Mammalia
- Order: Rodentia
- Family: Cricetidae
- Subfamily: Arvicolinae
- Genus: Craseomys
- Species: C. regulus

Binomial name
- Craseomys regulus Thomas, 1907

= Royal vole =

Species of rodent

The royal vole (Craseomys regulus), also called the Korean red-backed vole, is a species of vole endemic to the Korean Peninsula. It lives underground in a burrow, emerging at night to feed on grasses, seeds and other vegetation. The International Union for Conservation of Nature has listed its conservation status as being of "least concern".

== Taxonomy ==
British zoologist Oldfield Thomas first described the royal vole in 1907 as Craseomys regulus, with the type locality bein in Mingyong in South Korea, 170 km (106 mi) southeast of Seoul. It was later transferred to the genus Myodes, becoming Myodes regulus, but many authorities believed it was a subspecies of Myodes rufocanus. Myodes was later deemed a junior synonym of Lemmus and the species was returned to Craseomys. It has unrooted molar teeth, a characteristic shared by the very similar Craseomys shanseius but not C. rufocanus, and molecular analysis shows that it is a distinct species.

== Description ==
This vole has a head-and-body length of about 110 mm (4.3 in) with a tail of 42 to 51 mm (1.7 to 2.0 in). An adult royal vole weighs 23 to 39 g (0.8 to 1.4 oz). The ears are large and are covered in short fur, and the body hair is fine and soft. The dorsal pelage is reddish-brown, the flanks greyish-brown and the underparts buffy-brown. The tail is bicoloured, dark above and pale beneath. Apart from the unrooted molar teeth, it can be distinguished from the grey red-backed vole by having a redder back, a more buffy (rather than greyer) underparts and a longer tail.

== Distribution ==
The royal vole is endemic to the Korean peninsula. Its range includes all the southern parts of the peninsula as far north as the southern and western edges of the Kaema Plateau, where it gives way to the grey red-backed vole (Craseomys rufocanus). It is not present in the extreme northeasterly part of North Korea. It occupies a range of habitats including mountain forests, bamboo woodland, scrub-covered hillsides, rocky slopes, rough grassland, cultivated land and river banks.

== Ecology ==
The species is mainly nocturnal, and is herbivorous, foraging for plant material including grasses and seeds. It lives underground in a large and deep tunnel system that it excavates. This includes larder chambers for storing food and a nesting chamber lined with grasses, but not latrine chambers. It is a social species, issuing alarm calls to alert others to danger. Predators include foxes, martens, weasels, raccoon dogs, owls, birds of prey and snakes. Breeding takes place three to five times a year, with three or four young being born after a gestation period of 23 days.

== Status ==
C. regulus is not facing any particular threats and is adaptable, so the International Union for Conservation of Nature has listed its conservation status as being of "least concern".

== Bibliography ==
- Won, Byeong-o (원병오) (2004). 한국의 포유동물 (Hangugui poyudongmul, Mammals of Korea). Seoul: Dongbang Media. ISBN 89-8457-310-8.
