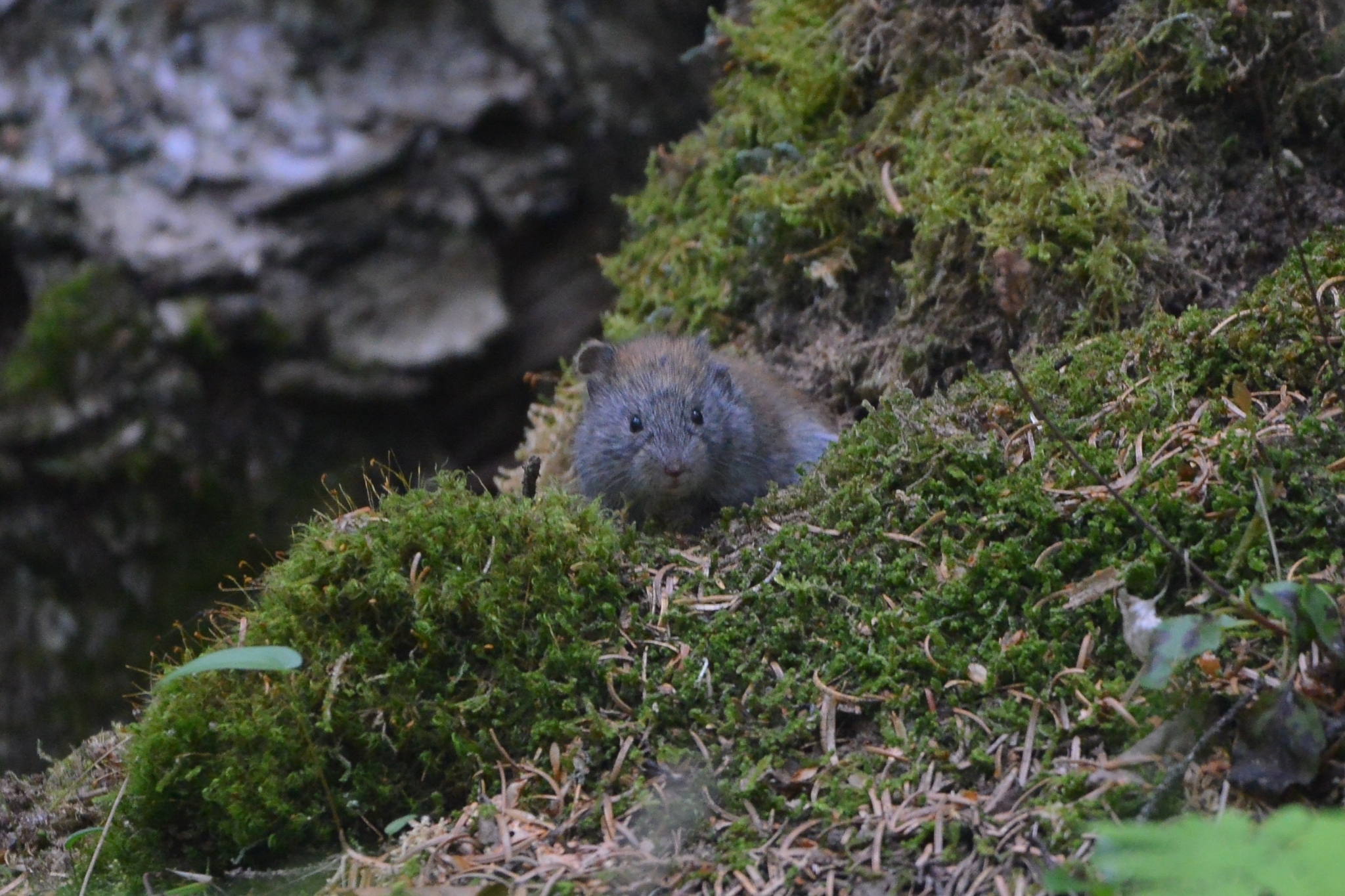
- Craseomys rufocanus

Scientific classification
- Kingdom: Animalia
- Phylum: Chordata
- Class: Mammalia
- Infraclass: Placentalia
- Order: Rodentia
- Family: Cricetidae
- Subfamily: Arvicolinae
- Tribe: Clethrionomyini
- Genus: Craseomys; Miller, 1900

Type species
- Hypudaeus rufocanus Sundevall, 1846

Species
- Craseomys andersoni; Craseomys imaizumii; Craseomys regulus; Craseomys rex; Craseomys rufocanus; Craseomys shanseius; Craseomys smithii

= Craseomys =

Genus of rodents

Craseomys is a genus of small, slender voles.

The complete list of species is:

- Anderson's red-backed vole, C. andersoni
- Imaizumi's red-backed vole, C. imaizumii
- Korean red-backed vole, C. regulus
- Hokkaido red-backed vole, C. rex
- Grey red-backed vole, C. rufocanus
- Shansei vole, C. shanseius
- Smith's vole, C. smithii
