= Richard Gordon Smith =

British traveler, sportsman and naturalist

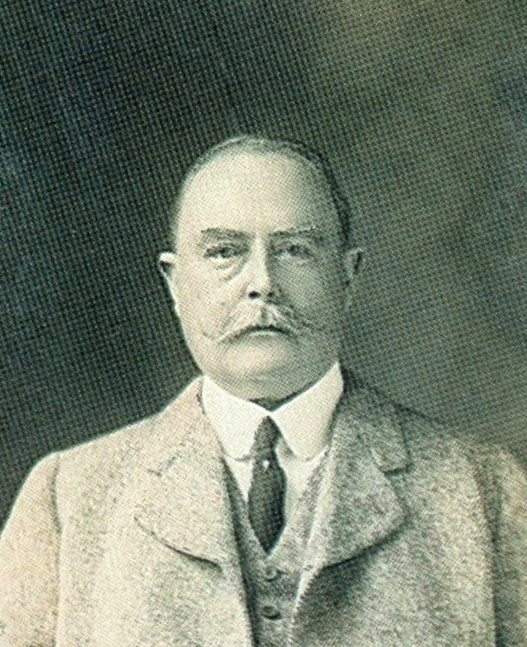

Richard Gordon Smith (1858 – 6 November 1918) was a British traveler, sportsman, and naturalist who traveled extensively in the late 19th century and lived in Japan for a number of years.

== Life ==
Richard Gordon Smith was an English gentleman, naturalist and sportsman who enjoyed traveling abroad, visiting France, Norway and Canada in his early years. Richard's father was John Bridson Smith, the youngest in a family of nine children, and his mother was Annie Lawrence of Cheltenham. It was from her family that he acquired his interest in sporting pursuits.

Illustration from Ancient Tales and Folklore of Japan

After being married for 18 years, he could no longer tolerate living with his wife, so he left home and took up world travel. It is likely that he was a man of some means as he always travelled first class. He kept a series of eight large leather-bound diaries in which he recorded his experiences. He called these his "Ill-Spelled Diaries", and they are full of idiosyncratic and chauvinistic observations of things he encountered, his impressions of Japan, the Russo-Japanese War, and the daily life of the people. They included illustrations and mementoes from around the world. He journeyed to the Far East, visiting Ceylon (now Sri Lanka) and Burma (now Myanmar) He arrived in Japan on Christmas Eve 1897, and he remained there until February 1900, when he set off to return to England via New Guinea and Fiji. However, he became ill and abandoned the journey, returning to Japan instead. In 1903 and again in 1905 he did travel to England, visiting China, Singapore, and Ceylon on his way. He returned to Kyoto at the end of 1905 where he continued transcribing folktales and myths and filling his diaries with his observations.

Smith also collected animals and plants, which he sent to the British Museum. Many of these were new to science and were named in his honour.

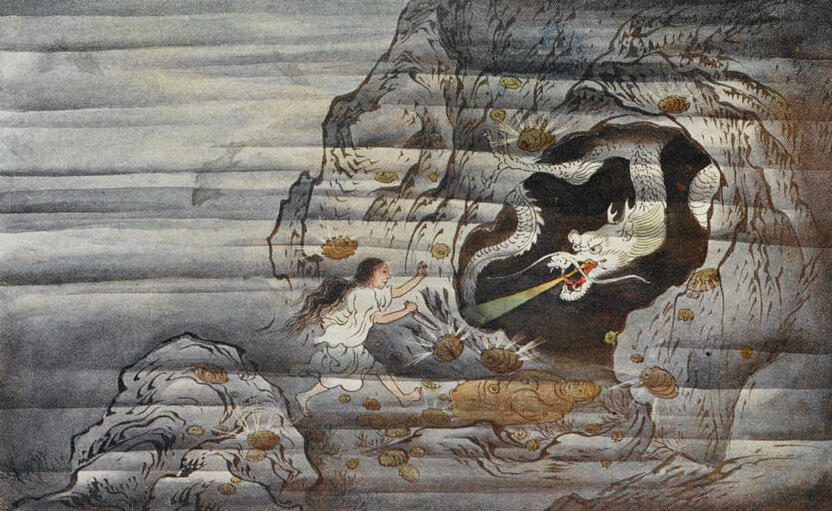
O Tokoyo and Monster by Smith, depicting legend of Tokoyo fighting a serpent, A Story of Oki Islands, Ancient Tales and Folklore of Japan, 1908

In 1908, he published Ancient Tales and Folklore of Japan, but it was not greeted with much interest in Britain. In the preface he states:

THE stories in this volume are transcribed from voluminous illustrated diaries which have been kept by me for some twenty years spent in travel and in sport in many lands--the last nine of them almost entirely in Japan, while collecting subjects of natural history for the British Museum; trawling and dredging in the Inland Sea, sometimes with success, sometimes without, but in the end contributing to the treasury some fifty things new to Science, and, according to Sir Edwin Ray Lankester, 'adding greatly to the knowledge of Japanese Ethnology.'

By 1910, his financial circumstances were deteriorating and his wife was asking for a legal separation. He suffered from beriberi and malaria and his health continued to worsen. The last entry in his diary was made in September 1915. He died on 6 November 1918, and an obituary was published in the Japanese ''Weekly Chronicle''.

He was awarded the Fourth Order of the Rising Sun in Japan.

== Works ==
- Ancient Tales and Folklore of Japan
- Travels in the Land of the Gods: The Japan Diaries of Richard Gordon Smith

== Species linked to Smith ==
- Aglaia smithii
- Ahnfeltiopsis smithii
- Anas smithii (Cape shoveler)
- Bathyraja smithii (African softnose skate)
- Chodsigoa smithii (Smith's shrew)
- Crocidura smithii (Desert musk shrew)
- Spirobranchus smithii (Many spined climbing perch)
- Cypripedium smithii
- Damburneya smithii
- Dendropanax alberti-smithii
- Durio wyatt-smithii
- Eospalax smithii (Smith's zokor)
- Euphorbia smithii
- Ficus albert-smithii (Figueira-do-alberto)
- Gekko smithii (Smith's green-eyed gecko)
- Geophaps smithii (Partridge pigeon)
- Herpestes smithii (Ruddy mongoose)
- Hirundo smithii (Wire-tailed swallow)
- Hopea wyattsmithii
- Kerivoula smithii (Smith's woolly bat)
- Leptocharias smithii (Barbeled houndshark)
- Lissonycteris smithii (Angolan fruit bat)
- Megalogomphus smithii
- Myodes smithii (Smith's red-backed vole)
- Pangshura smithii (Brown roofed turtle)
- Pisonia donnellsmithii (Cagalero)
- Podocarpus smithii
- Pouteria austin-smithii
- Procordulia smithii
- Rotala smithii
- Stygobromus smithi (Alabama well amphipod)
- Syagrus smithii
- Synodontis smithii (Shield-head catfish)
- Tlalocohyla smithii
- Trachypithecus smithii (Dusky leaf-monkey)
