= A Story of Oki Islands =

Supposed Japanese folk story

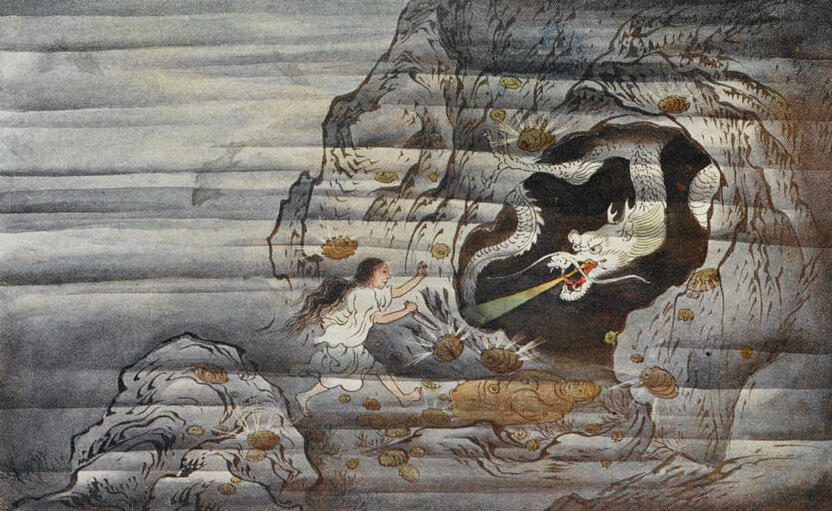
O-Tokoyo and Monster (painting by Richard Gordon Smith, 1918)

A Story of Oki Islands is a supposed Japanese folk story found in Richard Gordon Smith's 1918 book Ancient Tales and Folk-Lore of Japan. Set in the Oki Islands located in the Sea of Japan, the story portrays Tokoyo as the daughter of an exiled samurai who slew a malevolent sea monster that demanded the sacrifice of virgin maidens.

The story of the Yofune-nushi and O-tokoyo was recorded by Richard Gordon Smith in the book Ancient Tales and Folk-Lore of Japan, published in 1918. In the story, Yofune-nushi is a monster, living in the sea near the coast of one of the Oki Islands. It demanded a tribute of a virgin once a year. A brave girl, called Tokoyo, dives into the sea instead of the girl intended as an offering and defeats the unsuspecting monster. She also finds a cursed wooden idol that was causing a nobleman grief, thereby lifting the curse.

== Tokoyo and Yofune-nushi ==
Smith's story begins by identifying Tokoyo as the eighteen-year-old daughter of a samurai from Shima Peninsula (part of Ise Province) named Oribe Shima, who was exiled to the Oki Islands by Hōjō Takatoki, the ruling regent or shikken of Japan's Kamakura shogunate in the early 14th century. Determined to find her father, Tokoyo set out for a place called Akasaki, which was just off the coast from the Oki Islands. Although she asked the fishermen to ferry her there, they all refused, since it was forbidden to visit anyone banished there. Undaunted, Tokoyo took a boat and sailed to the islands herself, spending the night on the beach. The next morning, she encountered a fisherman, whom she asked about her father. The fisherman replied he knew nothing, and warned her not to ask anyone else about his whereabouts.

Coming upon a small shrine, Tokoyo implored the Buddha for his aid to find her father and then laid down to rest. She was awoken by the sound of a girl crying, and looked up to see a fifteen-year-old girl and a priest, who was leading the girl to the edge of a cliff. Tokoyo quickly came to the girl's rescue. The priest then explained he was going to sacrifice the girl in order to appease an evil kami living under the sea named Yofuné-Nushi, who demanded the annual sacrifice of a young girl. Tokoyo offered to take the girl's place and handed the priest a letter addressed to her father. She then drew an ancestral dagger, clenched it between her teeth, and dived down into the sea.

At the bottom of the sea, Tokoyo found a mighty cave, in which was housed a wooden statue of Hōjō Takatoki, the man who exiled her father. Thinking of bringing it back with her to the surface, she tied it to herself and began to swim back. Before she could leave the cave, a large, luminous serpentine monster (Yofuné-Nushi) confronted her. Devoid of fear, Tokoyo first stabbed it in the eye, blinding it, then relentlessly attacked until she succeeded in killing it. She then went back to the surface, Takatoki's statue and Yofuné-Nushi's carcass in tow. Word of Tokoyo's heroic deed spread, eventually reaching the ears of Takatoki, who had then been suffering from an unknown ailment – apparently caused by the maker of the statue's curse, which also brought into existence the monstrous Yofuné-Nushi. With the curse lifted, Takatoki ordered the release of Oribe Shima. The father and daughter happily returned to their home town.

The story concludes by noting that Yofuné-Nushi's remains were buried in the shrine Tokoyo spent the night (with another shrine being built to commemorate Tokoyo's defeat of the monster, named the "Tomb of the Sea Serpent"), while Takatoki's statue was transferred to a temple in Kamakura.

== Authenticity of the story ==
There seem to be no Japanese sources confirming the story, and Richard Gordon Smith himself points out in the preface of the story that he did not verify it and does not vouch for its authenticity.

== See also ==
- Oki Islands
- Yamata no Orochi
- Yomi
