= Anderson's white-bellied rat =

Conservation status
- Least Concern (IUCN 3.1)

Scientific classification
- Kingdom: Animalia
- Phylum: Chordata
- Class: Mammalia
- Order: Rodentia
- Family: Muridae
- Genus: Niviventer
- Species: N. andersoni

Binomial name
- Niviventer andersoni (Thomas, 1911)

Species of rodent

Anderson's white-bellied rat (Niviventer andersoni) is a species of rodent in the family Muridae. It is endemic to China and known from Yunnan, Sichuan, and Shaanxi provinces. Its range might extend to northern Guizhou. It inhabits montane forest at elevations of 2,000–3,000 m (6,600–9,800 ft) above sea level. Its species name "andersoni" was chosen to honor American scientific collector Malcolm Playfair Anderson.
