= Japanese red-backed vole =

Conservation status
- Least Concern (IUCN 3.1)

Scientific classification
- Kingdom: Animalia
- Phylum: Chordata
- Class: Mammalia
- Order: Rodentia
- Family: Cricetidae
- Subfamily: Arvicolinae
- Genus: Craseomys
- Species: C. andersoni

Binomial name
- Craseomys andersoni (Thomas, 1905)

Species of rodent

The Japanese red-backed vole, Wakayama red-backed vole, or Anderson's red-backed vole (Craseomys andersoni) is a species of rodent in the family Cricetidae. It is found only on the island of Honshu in Japan. It was first described by the British zoologist Oldfield Thomas in 1905. Thomas named it in honor of scientific collector Malcolm Playfair Anderson. The International Union for Conservation of Nature lists it as "least concern".

== Distribution and habitat ==
The Japanese red-backed vole is endemic to the island of Honshu in Japan and occurs in the Chūbu region, the Hokuriku region and in the more northerly parts of the island, and also in the Kii Peninsula. It is mostly found at altitudes of over 400 metres (1,300 ft) but below the alpine zone. It typically occurs in rocky areas and around rivers, as well as in banks, dykes and stone walls in agricultural areas.
