= List of reptiles of Finland =

This is a list of reptiles of Finland. There are five species and all are protected by law. Currently Coronella austriaca is classified as vulnerable.

== Lizards ==
Image	Name
	Slow worm (Anguis fragilis)
	Viviparous lizard (Zootoca vivipara)

== Snakes ==
Image	Name	Head (dorsal)	Head (lateral)
	Common adder (Vipera berus)		
	Grass snake (Natrix natrix)		
	Smooth snake (Coronella austriaca)		

== Sources ==
- THE REPTILES OF FINLAND Abstract of the article: Marika Rökman: Suomen luonnonvaraiset matelijat, Herpetomania vol.5.no.3-4/1996 pp.5-13
- Cox, N.A. and Temple, H.J. 2009. European Red List of Reptiles. Luxembourg: Office for Official Publications of the European Communities ISBN 978-92-79-11357-4
