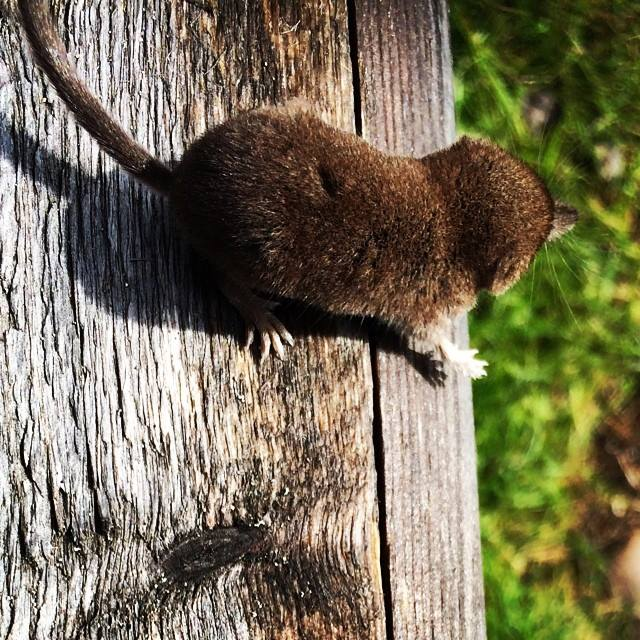
- Specimen with typical white feet (the brush tail is not shown)

Conservation status
- Least Concern (IUCN 3.1)

Scientific classification
- Kingdom: Animalia
- Phylum: Chordata
- Class: Mammalia
- Order: Eulipotyphla
- Family: Soricidae
- Genus: Sorex
- Species: S. caecutiens

Binomial name
- Sorex caecutiens Laxmann, 1788
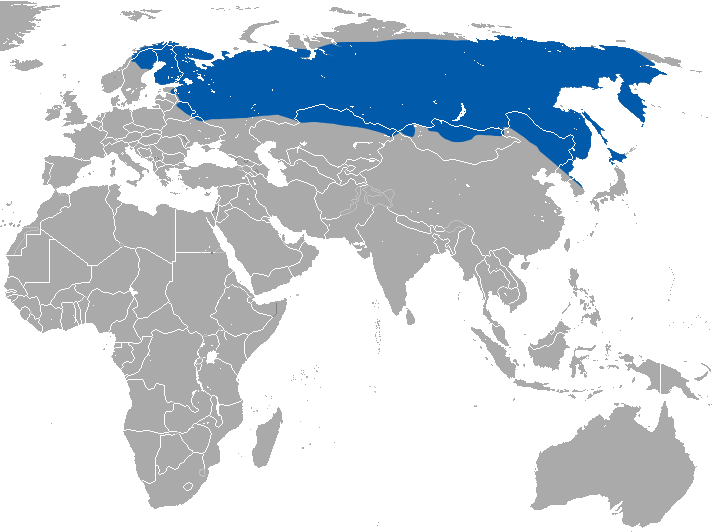
- Laxmann's shrew range

= Laxmann's shrew =

Species of mammal

Laxmann's shrew (Sorex caecutiens), or the masked shrew, is a species of shrew. Its range extends from northern Scandinavia and the Baltic to the Sea of Japan, including Hokkaidō, Sakhalin, and the Korean Peninsula. It favours mountain forests but is sometimes found in tundra and moorland, and also in lowland areas as well. It avoids cultivated land.

== Taxonomy ==
This shrew was first described in 1788 by the Finnish-Swedish explorer and naturalist Erik Laxmann, who called it Sorex caecutiens, and it is commonly known as Laxmann's shrew. The type locality is to the southwest of Lake Baikal in Russia. Several subspecies are recognised, including S. c. hallamontanus from Jeju Island in South Korea.

== Description ==
An adult Laxmann's shrew has a weight of 3 to 11 g (0.1 to 0.4 oz) and a head-and-body length of 4.8 to 7.8 cm (1.9 to 3.1 in), with a tail of 3.9 to 5.2 cm (1.5 to 2.0 in). The snout is long and narrow and lacks a pale coloured streak at the side. The teeth have red tips, and the dentition distinguishes this shrew from other similar species. The fur is shiny, the pelage is bicoloured, and the feet are white. The tail is always more than half the head-and-body length, and is usually more than 65%; the tail has no long hairs except for a tuft at the tip.

== Distribution and habitat ==
Laxmann's shrew is found in the taiga zone of northern Europe and Asia. Its range extends from Norway and Sweden through northern Siberia to northwestern and northeastern China, Korea, Japan, and Sakhalin Island. It is widely distributed in both mountain and lowland forests, and also in the adjoining tundra. It favours damp woodland with plenty of moss, bushy scrub, and small trees, and the banks of streams and borders of swamps on moorland. It is not found on cultivated land.

== Ecology ==
This species is mainly diurnal and feeds on small invertebrates such as insects (especially beetles), spiders, millipedes, and earthworms, as well as conifer seeds when available. Breeding takes place in the summer when up to four litters of 2 to 11 (usually 7 or 8) young are born in an underground nest. Longevity is probably about one year.

== Status ==
S. caecutiens has an extremely wide distribution and is described as being abundant in many parts of its range. Other than the felling of timber, no particular threats have been identified, the total population size seems to be steady and the International Union for Conservation of Nature has rated its conservation status as being of "least concern".

== See also ==
- List of mammals of Finland
- List of mammals of Korea
