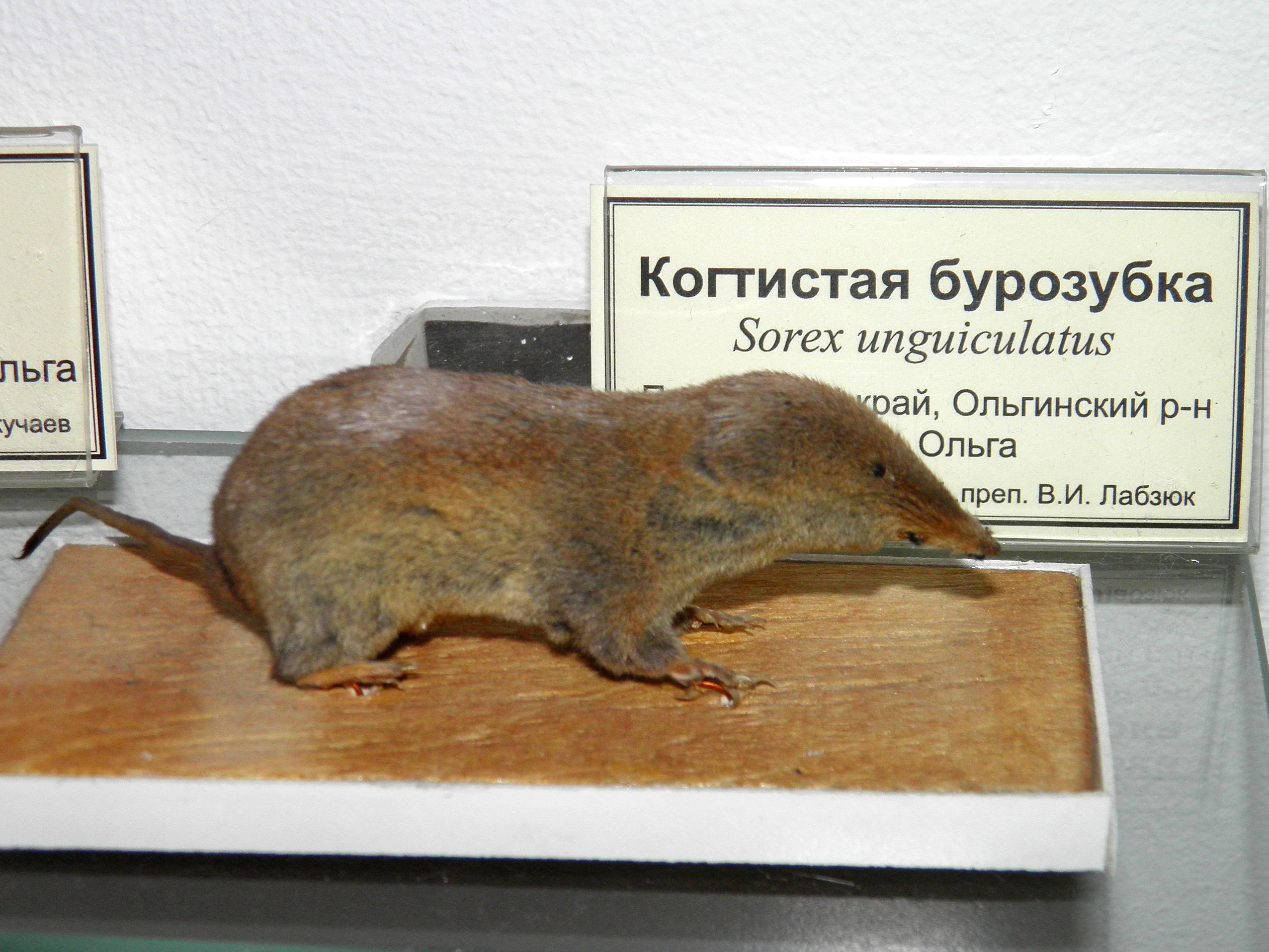

Conservation status
- Least Concern (IUCN 3.1)

Scientific classification
- Kingdom: Animalia
- Phylum: Chordata
- Class: Mammalia
- Order: Eulipotyphla
- Family: Soricidae
- Genus: Sorex
- Species: S. unguiculatus

Binomial name
- Sorex unguiculatus Dobson, 1890
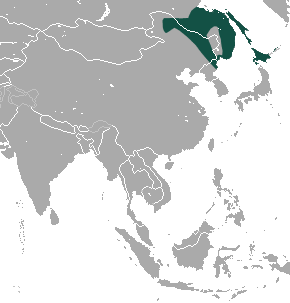
- Long-clawed shrew range

= Long-clawed shrew =

Species of mammal

The long-clawed shrew (Sorex unguiculatus) is a species of shrew. An adult long-clawed shrew has a weight of less than 20 grams (0.71 oz) and a body length of 54 millimetres (2.1 in) to 97 millimetres (3.8 in), with a tail of 40 millimetres (1.6 in) to 53 millimetres (2.1 in). It is distributed through the uplands of northeastern Asia, including northeastern North Korea.
