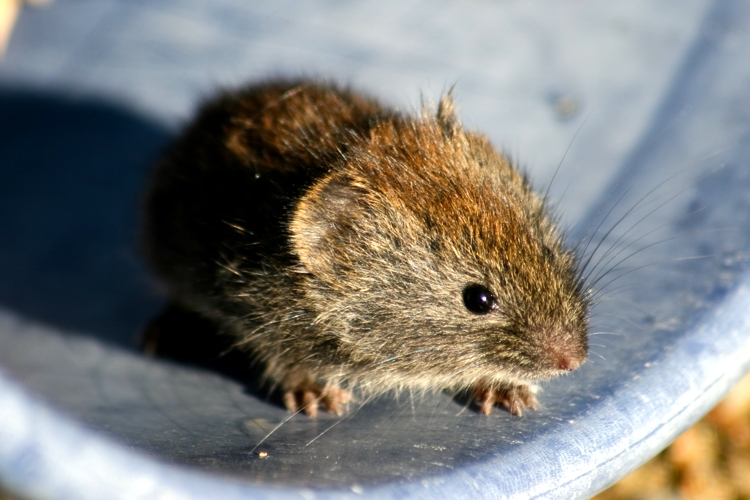

Conservation status
- Least Concern (IUCN 3.1)

Scientific classification
- Kingdom: Animalia
- Phylum: Chordata
- Class: Mammalia
- Order: Rodentia
- Family: Cricetidae
- Subfamily: Arvicolinae
- Genus: Craseomys
- Species: C. rufocanus

Binomial name
- Craseomys rufocanus (Sundevall, 1846)
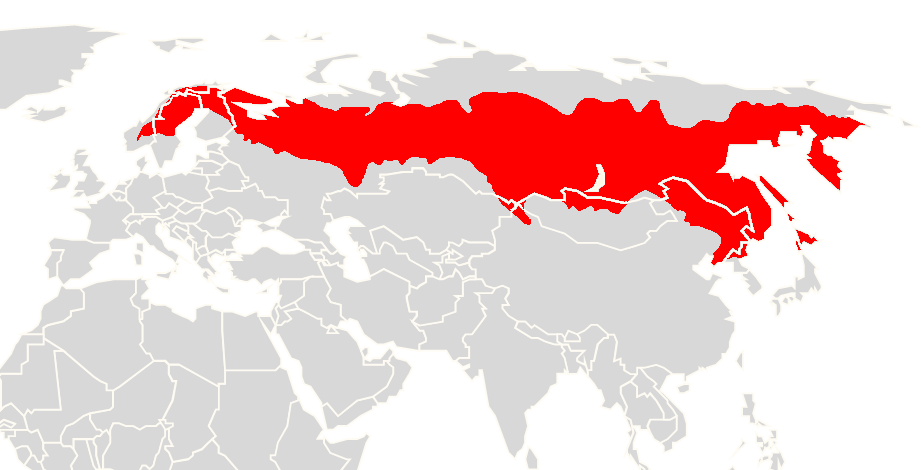
- Range of Craseomys rufocanus

Synonyms
- Clethrionomys rufocanus; Myodes rufocanus; Myodes sikotanensis

= Grey red-backed vole =

Species of rodent

The grey red-backed vole or the grey-sided vole (Craseomys rufocanus) is a species of vole. An adult grey red-backed vole weighs 20-50 grams. This species ranges across northern Eurasia, including northern China, the northern Korean Peninsula, and the islands of Sakhalin and Hokkaidō. It is larger and longer-legged than the northern red-backed vole (Clethrionomys rutilus), which covers a similar range and it is also sympatric with the Norwegian lemming (Lemmus lemmus).

== Description ==
The grey red-backed vole has a reddish-coloured back and grey sides. It has a head and body length of 4.5 to 5.25 in (114 to 133 mm) and a tail length of 1 to 1.75 in (25 to 44 mm). It can be distinguished from the bank vole by its larger size and distinctive reddish back and from the northern red-backed vole by its larger size, longer legs and relatively longer tail. The molar teeth of adults are rooted in the jaws.

== Distribution and habitat ==
The grey red-backed vole is native to northern Europe and Asia. Its range extends from Norway, Sweden and Finland eastwards through northern Russia to the Kamchatka Peninsula. It includes the Ural Mountains, the Altai Mountains, northern Korea, Sakhalin Island, Japan, northern Mongolia and China. Its altitude range extends from sea level to 1,170 m (3,839 ft) in Scandinavia and to 2,700 m (8,858 ft) in the Khangai Mountains in Mongolia. Its typical habitat is dense undergrowth or rocky areas in coniferous or birch forests, often near rivers, but it is also found in clear cut areas of forests, rough grassland, subarctic shrubby heathland and dry peat bogs.

== Biology ==
The grey red-backed vole feeds on grasses and small herbs, the leaves and shoots of sub-shrubs and berries. It prefers the bilberry (Vaccinium myrtillus) to the northern crowberry (Empetrum nigrum ssp. hermaphroditum) which contains unpalatable phenolic substances.

In tundra regions, this vole exhibits outbreaks when its numbers increase substantially. These occur in a four to five-year population cycle the reasons for which are not fully understood but which may reflect changes in the abundance of certain specialised predators. Lemmings have similar but more violent population explosions. These happen in the same years as vole outbreaks, but occur less frequently. This is partly because lemmings continue to breed during the winter months while populations of grey red-backed voles decline during the winter.

== Status ==
The grey red-backed vole is listed by the IUCN as being of "Least Concern". This is because it is a common species with a very wide range and faces no particular threats. Populations vary cyclically but may be declining somewhat in Fennoscandia, possibly due to changes in forestry practice.
