= List of mammals of Korea =

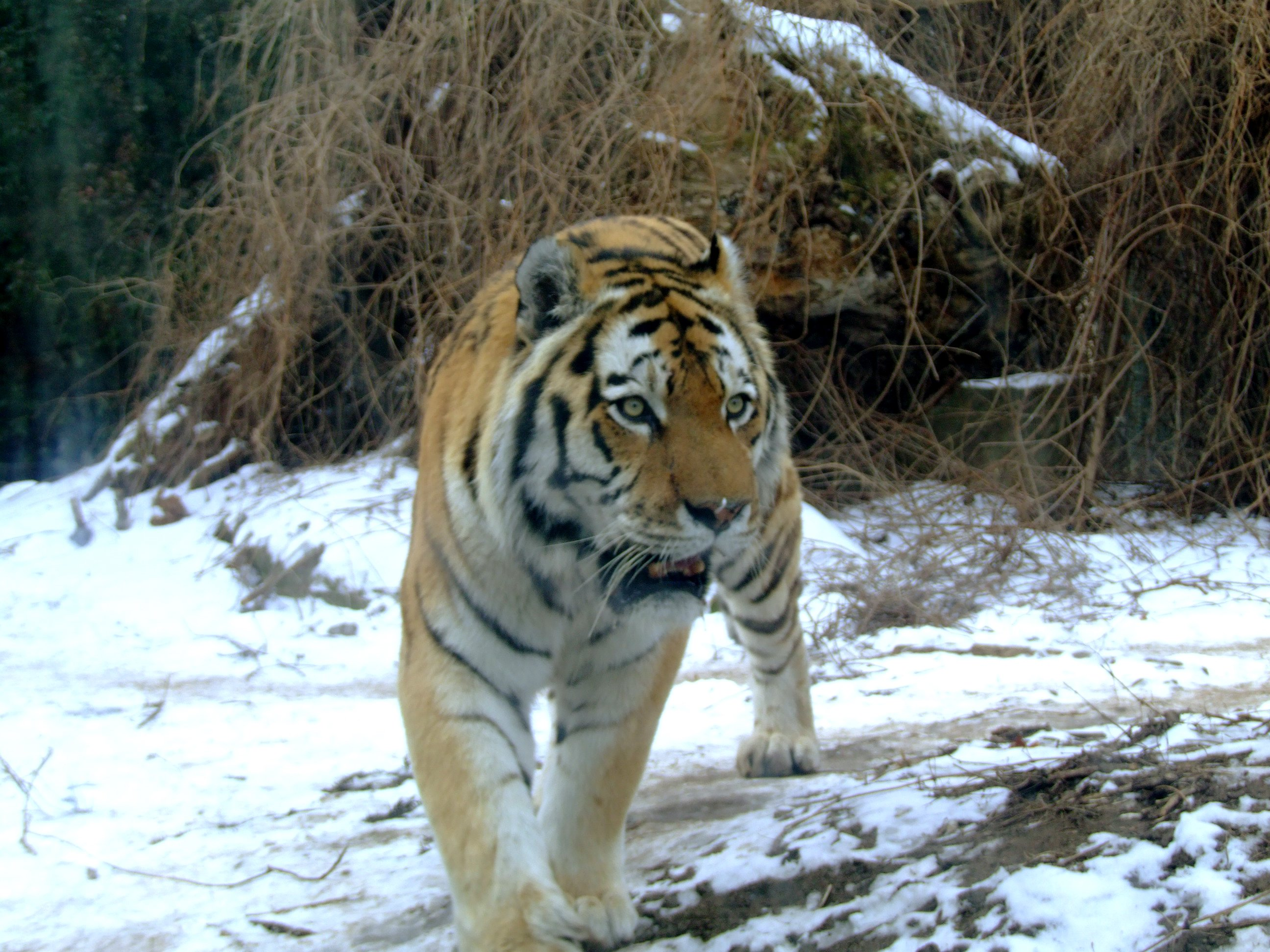
The Siberian tiger is the national animal of South Korea.

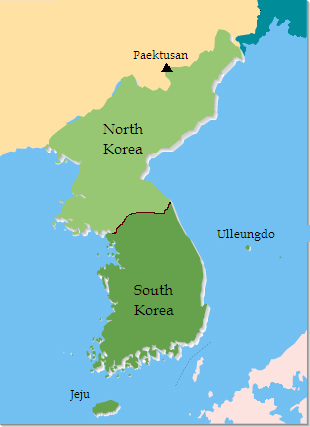
Korean Peninsula and surrounding islands

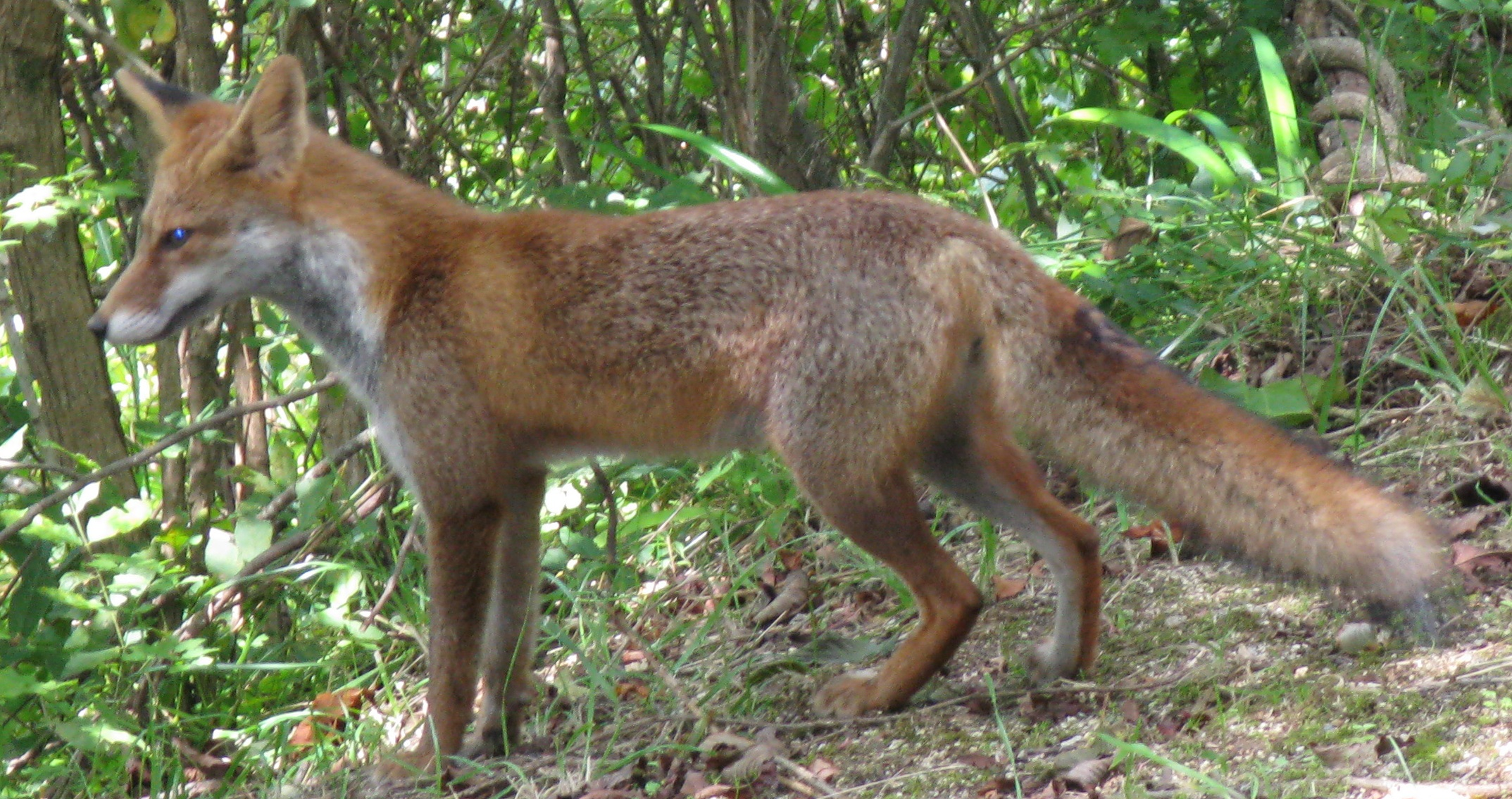
Once common throughout Korea, the red fox is now extremely rare.

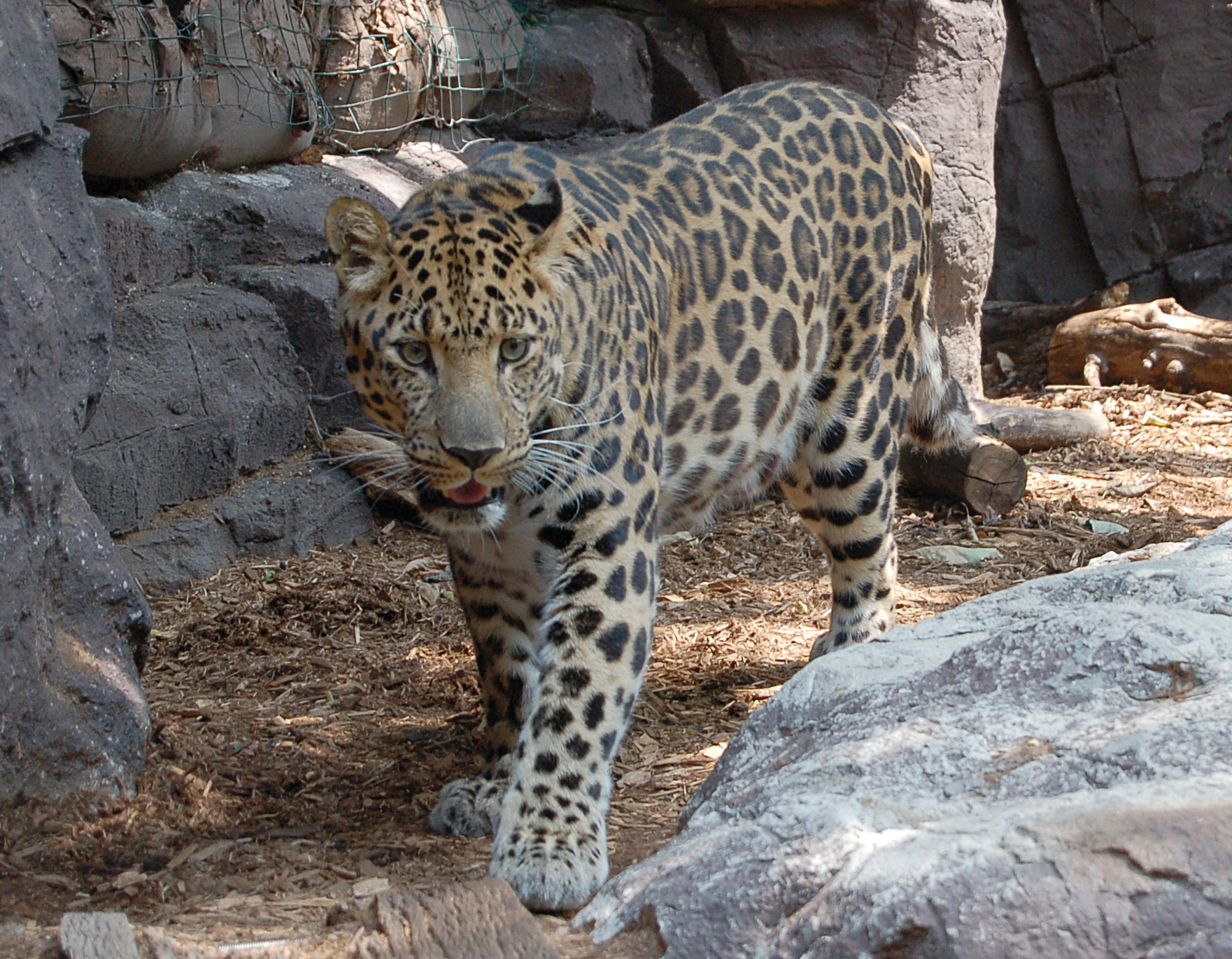
The Amur leopard was one of the most abundant large carnivores in the Korean peninsula. However, they are extremely rare in North Korea and are extirpated from South Korea.

Approximately 100 species of mammal are known to inhabit, or to have recently inhabited, the Korean Peninsula and its surrounding waters. This includes a few species that were introduced in the 20th century; the coypu was introduced for farming in the 1990s, and the muskrat was introduced in the early 20th century into the Russian Far East, and was subsequently first recorded in Korea in the Tumen River basin in 1965. The Siberian tiger is the national animal of South Korea. The Siberian tiger and Amur leopard have most likely been extirpated from Korea, but are still included in standard lists of Korean mammals.

Most Korean mammal species are found only in a small part of Korea, or have been extirpated by human activity. The large southeastern island of Jeju, and the rugged northeastern Paektu Mountain region, are particularly known for their distinctive mammal species. Several species, including the Dsinezumi shrew, are found only on Jeju, while many other species, such as the wild boar, are absent or extirpated from there. Some mammals, such as the Manchurian wapiti, are considered natural monuments of North Korea, while others, such as the spotted seal, are considered natural monuments of South Korea.

== Order Artiodactyla: even-toed ungulates ==
Common name (Korean name)	Species (authority)	Preferred habitat	Range	Status
Family Bovidae: bovids
Aurochs (오록스)	Bos primigenius (Bojanus, 1827)	Dense forest	Historically throughout mainland	I: Extinct
Long-tailed goral (산양)	Naemorhedus caudatus (Hamilton Smith, 1827)	High mountains	Historically found throughout the Taebaek Mountains; northern Taebaek Mountains, including the Demilitarized Zone.	I: Vulnerable; K: Endangered; NK: Natural monument; SK: Natural monument
Family Cervidae: deer
Siberian roe deer (노루)	Capreolus pygargus (Pallas, 1771)	Forest verges	Throughout; not found on Ulleungdo	
Manchurian wapiti (대륙사슴)	Cervus canadensis xanthopygus (H. Milne-Edwards, 1867)	Mixed and Deciduous forests	Historically found throughout mainland; extirpated: I: Least concern; K: Locally extinct Extirpated	
Manchurian sika deer (대륙사슴)	Cervus nippon mantchuricus (Temminck, 1838)	Open forest and forest verges	Historically found throughout mainland; extirpated	I: Least concern.; K: Vulnerable; NK: Natural monument
Water deer (고라니)	Hydropotes inermis (R. Swinhoe, 1870)	Low mountains and riparian areas; often visits urban areas	Throughout mainland	I: Near threatened; SK: Game
Family Moschidae: musk deer
Siberian musk deer (사향노루)	Moschus moschiferus (Linnaeus, 1758)	Mountain forest	Historically throughout mainland; North Korea; also found in Gangwon, South Korea	I: Vulnerable; K: Endangered; NK: Natural monument; SK: Natural monument
Family Suidae: pigs
Wild boar (멧돼지)	Sus scrofa ussuricus (Linnaeus, 1758)	Mountain forest	Throughout mainland	I: Least concern; SK: Game

== Order Carnivora: carnivores ==
Common name (Korean name)	Species (authority)	Preferred habitat	Range	Status
Family Canidae: canids
Grey wolf (늑대)	Canis lupus (Linnaeus, 1758)	Forests and open woods	Historically found throughout mainland, but only after human-induced declines of tigers; currently restricted Paektu Mountain area	I: Least concern; K: Endangered
Dhole (승냥이)	Cuon alpinus (Pallas, 1811)	Dense forest and high mountains	Historically found throughout mainland	I: Endangered; K: Vulnerable
Raccoon dog (너구리)	Nyctereutes procyonoides (Gray, 1834)	Wooded valleys	Throughout mainland	I: Least concern; K: Uncommon
Red fox (여우)	Vulpes vulpes (Linnaeus, 1758)	Brushy areas and forest verges	Historically throughout mainland; northern and northeastern Korea, reintroduction ongoing in South Korea	I: Least concern; K: Endangered
Family Felidae
Leopard cat (삵)	Prionailurus bengalensis (Kerr, 1792)	Dense forest	Throughout mainland, with major population in DMZ	I: Least concern; K: Vulnerable
Eurasian lynx (스라소니)	Lynx lynx (Linnaeus, 1758)	Montane forest	North Hamgyong and Chagang, North Korea; historical occurrence in South Korea uncertain	I: Least concern; K: Endangered
Leopard (표범)	Panthera pardus (Linnaeus, 1758)	High dense forest	Historically throughout mainland; extirpated; possibly northeastern North Korea	I: Vulnerable; K: Amur leopard (P. p. orientalis) (Schlegel, 1857) Endangered
Tiger (호랑이)	Panthera tigris (Linnaeus, 1758)	Rocky forest	Historically throughout the mainland; extirpated; possibly northeastern North Korea	I: Endangered; K: Siberian tiger (P. t. tigris) (Linnaeus, 1758) Endangered; NK: Siberian tiger (P. t. tigris) (Linnaeus, 1758) Critically endangered, natural monument
Family Mustelidae: mustelids
Eurasian otter (수달)	Lutra lutra (Linnaeus, 1758)	Riparian areas	Throughout mainland, scattered	I: Near threatened; K: Endangered; NK: Natural monument; SK: Natural monument
Yellow-throated marten (담비)	Martes flavigula (Boddaert, 1785)	High forest	Historically throughout mainland; northern Korea and parts of central and southern Korea	I: Least concern; K: Vulnerable
Sable (검은담비)	Martes zibellina (Linnaeus, 1758)	High, dense boreal forest	Historically found throughout northern and central Korea; North Hamgyong, northeastern North Korea	I: Least concern; K: Endangered; NK: Natural monument
Asian badger (오소리)	Meles leucurus (Hodgson, 1847)	Forests and mountain valleys. Fossorial.	Throughout mainland	I: Least concern
Least weasel (무산쇠족제비)	Mustela nivalis (Linnaeus, 1758)	Subalpine areas	Far northeastern and northwestern North Korea; also northern South Korea	I: Least concern; K: Rare to locally abundant
Siberian weasel (족제비)	Mustela sibirica (Pallas, 1773)	Forests and riparian areas	Throughout, including Jeju	I: Least concern; K: Locally abundant
Family Ursidae: bears
Brown bear (불곰)	Ursus arctos (Linnaeus, 1758)	Thick forest	Historically found in northern Korea; likely extirpated	I: Least concern; K: Endangered; NK: Natural monument
Asian black bear (반달가슴곰)	Ursus thibetanus (G. Cuvier, 1823)	Thick forest	Historically found throughout mainland; Jirisan (reintroduced) and DMZ area in South Korea; Mount Kumgang and Paektu Mountain in North Korea	I: Vulnerable; K: Endangered; SK: Natural monument
Superfamily Pinnipedia: pinnipeds
Common name (Korean name)	Species (authority)	Preferred habitat	Range	Status
Family Otariidae: eared seals
Northern fur seal (물개)	Callorhinus ursinus (Linnaeus, 1758)	Coasts and seas	Sea of Japan	I: Vulnerable
Steller sea lion (큰바다사자)	Eumetopias jubatus (Schreber, 1776)	Coasts and seas	Northern Yellow Sea and Sea of Japan	
Japanese sea lion (강치)	Zalophus japonicus (Peters, 1866)	Coasts and seas	East China Sea, Korea Strait, Sea of Japan	I: Extinct in 1970s (IUCN 3.1)
Harbor seal (잔점박이물범)	Phoca vitulina (Linnaeus, 1758)	Coasts and seas	Northern Sea of Japan	I: Least concern
Spotted seal (점박이물범)	Phoca largha (Pallas, 1811)	Coasts and seas	Throughout Yellow Sea, Sea of Japan, and Korea Strait; large colony on Baengnyeongdo	I: Least concern; K: Vulnerable; SK: Natural monument

== Order Cetacea: whales ==
Common name (Korean name)	Species (authority)	Preferred habitat	Range	Status
Suborder Mysticeti: baleen whales
Family Balaenidae: right whales
North Pacific right whale (북태평양참고래)	Eubalaena japonica (Lacépède, 1818)	High reliance on coastal waters	Sea of Japan, Korea Strait, Yellow Sea, East China Sea (wiped out by Japanese, Soviet, and American whalers): It is unknown whether historically whales were seen for year-round in Korean waters.; All modern records of the species in Yellow Sea had been concentrated vicinity to Haiyang Island, and all modern catches and strandings and sightings in East China Sea have been restricted around Amami Oshima (5 records on Amami and Sukomobanare Islands in the last 110 years) until 2014 as a right whale entered and cavorted in the port of Ushibuka, Kumamoto, later being chased out by fishery boats to concern either boat-struck or damage to fishery (Eubalaena sp. never or mostly does not feed on fish) on March.; Last record sighting on Amami was of a 10-meter individual off Cape Miyakozaki on January 28, 2014, and another whale (unknown whether or not the same individual) swam into Ushibuka Port on March 28. Prior to this, a 10-meter individual was seen in Yakiuchi Bay on April 12, 1997.; Last record in Yellow Sea was of the catch of a single whale in the south of Haiyang Dao in December 1977. Prior to this, a pair was caught off Haiyang Dao by Japanese whalers in north of the island in January 1973 where both of these were later made to be specimen where smaller specimen became the only specimen (with skins and baleens) of the species in the world at the Dalian Natural History Museum, and the larger individual is now on the Zhejiang Museum of Natural History. reaching around 16–17.1m, and were later made to be specimens for exhibition at several locations. Many of these captured individuals were rather large individuals as reaching around 16m, and were later made to be specimens for exhibition at several locations. There have also been unknown quantity of modern catches exist on Taiwan as well. At least two whales were taken off Haiyang in the Yellow Sea in by Japanese whalers in 1944. There have been none of confirmed records along Chinese coasts targeting right whales since after the last catch (or a sighting) in 1977. For the catches in the Yellow Sea, P Wang, the same researcher who reported the catch in December 1977 off Haiyang Island in the Yellow Sea mentioned that it was possibly the same record as one in 1944 by Japanese whalers.; The first confirmed record of the species happened in February, Namhae, 41 years after the last record in 1974 (an illegal catch).; This case was an entanglement and joint releasing effort by the governmental team and Busan aquarium was taken place, although the whale disappeared during the night after the efforts, the actual consequences of disappearance and the fate of whale is unclear due to failure of monitoring thereafter.	I: EN Endangered; CA: Endangered; Northeast Pacific subpopulation: I: CR Critically endangered
Bowhead whale (북극고래)	Balaena mysticetus (Linnaeus, 1758)	Coastal and frozen waters	Sea of Okhotsk: Not officially confirmed vicinity to Korean Peninsula, but historical catch (es) or sighting (s) off an area near Ulsan and Yangsan although this record(s) might or might not be of right whale (s).	I: EN Least concern; CA: Endangered; Sea of Okhotsk subpopulation: I: CREndangered
Family Eschrichtiidae: gray whales
Gray whale (귀신고래)	Eschrichtius robustus (Lilljeborg, 1861)	Migratory through coastal waters	Sea of Japan, Korea Strait, Yellow Sea, East China Sea (wiped out by Japanese whalers): Gray Whale Migration Site (울산 귀신고래 회유해면) was listed as South Korea's the 126th national monument in 1962, and national protection of higher priorities was situated although illegal hunts had been taken place thereafter, and there have been no recent sightings of the species in Korean waters.; There had been at least 24 records of gray whales in Chinese waters since in 1933 including sighting, stranding, and bycatches. DNA analysis of 2011 specimen indicate that this female might not originate in the western population.; Last record in Korean waters was of the sighting of a pair off Bangeojin, Ulsan in 1977.; Historically, possibly year-round residential happened in Chinese waters hence residential or semi-residential occurrences around Korean Peninsula could have been feasible as well.	*I: LC Endangered: CA: Threatened/special concern; BC: Blue List; QC: Listing candidate; I: Conservation dependent.; SK: Natural monument
Family Balaenopteridae: rorquals
Humpback whale (흑고래)	Megaptera novaeangliae (Borowski, 1781)	Coastal waters, often penetrates estuaries	Very small numbers in Sea of Japan and Korea Strait and Yellow Sea, seasonally residents in East China Sea: Being wiped out by Japanese whalers (see more details in Wildlife of China).	I: LC Least concern; CA: Threatened/not at risk; BC: Blue List
Minke whale (밍크고래)	Balaenoptera acutorostrata (Lacépède, 1804)	Widespread	Yellow Sea, East China Sea, Sea of Japan: Sea of Japan resident group is endangered, critically endangered semi-resident population exists in Yellow Sea.; Illegal catches had become objects of public concern among the world.	I: Near threatened.
Blue whale (대왕고래)	Balaenoptera musculus (Linnaeus, 1758)	Widespread but less common in Mediterranean seas (smaller numbers historically migrated into both sides of Korean Peninsula)	Regarded as being almost/already extinct in east Asian waters: Being wiped out by Japanese whalers. Of the populations that once existed off coastal Japan, the last recorded confirmed stranding was in the 1950s.; During cetacean sighting visual surveys in Tsushima Strait conducted by Japanese Coast Guard, several gigantic whales measuring over 20m in length have been observed in recent years, however their exact identities are unclear.	I: Conservation dependent.
Fin whale (긴수염고래)	Balaenoptera physalus (Linnaeus, 1758)	Coastal waters	Coastal groups in northeast Asian waters, along with many other baleen species, were likely driven into serious perils or functional extinctions by industrial catches by Japan covering wide ranges of China and Korean EEZ within very short period in 20th century.: After the functional extinction in Pacific side of Japanese waters between the 1910s and 1930s, Japanese whalers cornered other Asian populations into serious peril (functional extinction might have been possible for some groups like the one in East China Sea) After the cease of exploiting Asian stocks, Japan kept mass commercial and illegal hunts until 1975, and parts of Korean populations might have been damaged as several thousand individuals were hunted from various stations mainly along coasts of Hokkaido, Sanriku, and the Gotō Islands.; Very small number of residents in Sea of Japan, Korea Strait today, being almost extinct in Yellow Sea and East China Sea.; Recent sightings of large whales exceeding 20 m in length, likely to be fin whales, as blue whales in coastal northeast Asia are considered to be extinct, indicate that remnants of the Sea of Japan or the Yellow– ohai Sea groups still pass through the Tsushima Strait where all the larger cetaceans are under threats of being struck by high-speed vessels.; There had been congregation areas among Sea of Japan to Yellow Sea such as in East Korea Bay, along eastern coasts of Korean Peninsula, and Ulleungdo, although recent occurrences into these locations are of unclear due to locational disorders.; Fin whales in Yellow Sea could have been a unique form from outer Pacific populations due to their smaller size of around 20m or more at near maximum, and breeding season in these regions was mainly in winter.	I: Endangered.
Bryde's whale and Eden's whale (밍크고래)	Balaenoptera brydei Balaenoptera edeni	Widespread in both coastal and pelagic waters	Yellow Sea (possibly), East China Sea, Sea of Japan: Dozens of illegal catches were taken place at least until in 1970s.	I: Endangered.
Omura's whale (오무라고래)	Balaenoptera omurai	Widespread in both coastal and pelagic waters	East China Sea, Sea of Japan: Not officially confirmed in Korean EEZ, but the specimen led to listing of the species as a valid was found on Tsunoshima in 1998 near Tsushima Strait)	I: Data deficient
Sei whale (밍크고래)	Balaenoptera borealis	Widespread	Yellow Sea, East China Sea, Sea of Japan	I: Endangered.
Suborder Odontoceti: toothed whales
Family Delphinidae: oceanic dolphins
Short-beaked common dolphin (짧은부리참돌고래)	Delphinus delphis (Linnaeus, 1758)	Warmer coastal waters	Throughout	I: Least concern; K: Unknown.
Common bottlenose dolphin (큰돌고래)	Tursiops truncatus	Warmer coastal and open waters	Throughout	I: Least concern
Indo-Pacific bottlenose dolphin (남방큰돌고래)	Tursiops aduncus	Warmer coastal waters	Endangered, resident at Jeju Island	I: Data deficient
Striped dolphin (줄무늬돌고래)	Stenella coeruleoalba	Warmer coastal and open waters		I: LR/cd.
Fraser's dolphin (사라와크돌고래)	Lagenodelphis hosei	Warmer coastal waters	Vagrant	I: Data deficient
Pacific white-sided dolphin (낫돌고래)	Sagmatias obliquidens (Gill, 1865)	Warmer coastal waters	Sea of Japan	I: Least concern
Risso's dolphin (큰코돌고래)	Grampus griseus	Coastal and open seas	Sea of Japan, Korea Strait, East China Sea	I: Data deficient
Family Globicephala: pilot whales
Short-finned pilot whale (들쇠고래)	Globicephala macrorhynchus	Open seas	Sea of Japan, Korea Strait, East China Sea	I:LR/cd
False killer whale (흑범고래)	Pseudorca crassidens	Coastal and open seas	Sea of Japan, Korea Strait, East China Sea	I:LR/lc
Pygmy killer whale (들고양이고래)	Feresa attenuata	Coastal and open seas	Korea Strait, East China Sea	I: Data deficient
Killer whale (범고래)	Orcinus orca (Linnaeus, 1758)	Coastal waters	Throughout (reduced by Japanese whalers)	I: Conservation dependent; K: Unknown, possibly common
Beluga (흰돌고래)	Delphinapterus leucas (Pallas, 1776)	Coastal waters	Vagrant from the Sea of Okhotsk	I: Vulnerable
Family Phocoenidae: porpoises
Dall's porpoise (까치돌고래)	Phocoenoides dalli (True, 1885)	Colder ocean waters	North of the 35th parallel in the Sea of Japan	I: Vulnerable
Harbour porpoise (쇠돌고래)	Phocoena phocoena (Linnaeus, 1758)	Colder ocean waters	Sea of Japan	I: Conservation dependent
Finless porpoise (상괭이)	Neophocaena phocaenoides (Cuvier, 1829)	Coastal waters	Yellow Sea (such as at Baengnyeongdo), Korea Strait, southern Sea of Japan	I: Data deficient.; K: Caught frequently.
Family Physeteridae: sperm whales
Sperm whale (향고래)	Physeter macrocephalus (Linnaeus, 1758)	Deep oceans	Korea Strait, East China Sea, Sea of Japan (in small numbers)	I: Vulnerable
Family Ziphiidae: beaked whales
Giant beaked whale (큰부리고래)	Berardius bairdii (Stejneger, 1883)	Open seas	Sea of Japan (reduced by Japanese whalers)	I: Conservation dependent
Cuvier's beaked whale (민부리고래)	Ziphius cavirostris	Open seas	Sea of Japan, East China Sea	I: Least concern
Ginkgo-toothed beaked whale (은행이빨부리고래)	Mesoplodon ginkgodens	Open seas	Sea of Japan, Jeju, East China Sea, Yellow Sea	I: Data deficient

== Order Erinaceomorpha: hedgehogs ==
Common name (Korean name)	Species (authority)	Preferred habitat	Range	Status
Family Erinaceidae: hedgehogs
Amur hedgehog (고슴도치)	Erinaceus amurensis (Schrenk, 1859)	Deciduous and mixed forests	Throughout mainland	I: Least concern; K: Rare

== Order Soricomorpha: shrews and moles ==
Common name (Korean name)	Species (authority)	Preferred habitat	Range	Status
Family Talpidae: moles
Japanese mole (두더지)	Mogera wogura (Temminck, 1833)	High moist forest	Throughout mainland; not found on Jeju or Ulleungdo	I: Least concern; SK: Vermin
Family Soricidae: shrews
Dsinezumi shrew (제주땃쥐)	Crocidura dsinezumi (Temminck, 1842)	Damp forest and grassland	Found only on Jeju	I: Least concern; K: Uncertain
Ussuri white-toothed shrew (땃쥐)	Crocidura lasiura (Dobson, 1890)	Widespread	Throughout mainland	I: Least concern; K: Common
Lesser white-toothed shrew (작은땃쥐)	Crocidura suaveolens (Pallas, 1811)	Moist deciduous forest	Throughout, including Ulleungdo	I: Least concern; K: Common
Eurasian water shrew (갯첨서)	Neomys fodiens (Pennant, 1771)	Riparian areas and mountain lakes	Northern North Korea.	I: Least concern; K: Rare
Laxmann's shrew (뒤쥐)	Sorex caecutiens (Laxmann, 1788)	Rugged mountains	Northern and northeastern North Korea.	I: Least concern; K: Abundant
Siberian large-toothed shrew (백두산뒤쥐)	Sorex daphaenodon (Thomas, 1907)	Boreal forest and alpine meadows	Paektusan region.	I: Least concern
Slender shrew (쇠뒤쥐)	Sorex gracillimus (Thomas, 1907)	Coniferous forest and alpine regions	Northeastern North Korea.	I: Least concern; K: Common
Taiga shrew (큰발뒤쥐)	Sorex isodon (Turov, 1924)	Mountain forest	Baekdudaegan mountains.	I: Least concern
Eurasian least shrew (꼬마뒤쥐)	Sorex minutissimus (Zimmermann, 1780)	Rugged mountains bove 1500 meters	Central and northern Korea.	I: Least concern; K: Rare
Ussuri shrew (큰첨서)	Sorex mirabilis (Ognev, 1937)	Moist ground above 1500 meters	Central and northern Korea	I: Least concern; K: Rare
Long-clawed shrew (긴발톱첨서)	Sorex unguiculatus (Dobson, 1890)	High moist areas	Northeastern North Korea.	I: Least concern; K: Locally abundant

== Order Chiroptera: bats ==
Common name (Korean name)	Species (authority)	Preferred habitat	Range	Status
Family Rhinolophidae: horseshoe bats
Greater horseshoe bat (관박쥐)	Rhinolophus ferrumequinum (Schreber, 1774)	Roosts in caves and abandoned mines	Scattered throughout, including Jeju	I: Near threatened; K: Abundant
Family Vespertilionidae: vesper bats
Kobayashi's bat (고바야시박쥐)	Eptesicus koyabashii (Mori, 1928)		West central Korea.	I: Data deficient; K: Possibly very rare
Northern bat (생박쥐)	Eptesicus nilssonii (Keyserling & Blasius, 1839)		Found in Gyeonggi, northwestern South Korea, and North Hamgyong, northeastern North Korea	I: Least concern; K: Locally abundant
Serotine bat (문둥이박쥐)	Eptesicus serotinus (Schreber, 1774)	Roosts in roofs and walls	Most common in northwestern Korea	I: Least concern; K: Locally abundant
Savi's pipistrelle (큰집박쥐)	Hypsugo savii (Bonaparte, 1837)	Roosts in caves	Throughout	I: Least concern; K: Uncommon
Common bent-wing bat (긴날개박쥐)	Miniopterus schreibersi (Kuhl, 1817)	Grassland and forest in summer; caves in winter	Scattered throughout	I: Least concern; K: Rare
Little tube-nosed bat (작은관코박쥐)	Murina aurata (Milne-Edwards, 1872)		Unknown	I: Near threatened; K: Last recorded in 1959
Greater tube-nosed bat (관코박쥐)	Murina leucogaster (Milne-Edwards, 1872)		Unknown.	I: Least concern; K: Rare
Far Eastern myotis (흰배윗수염박쥐)	Myotis bombinus (Thomas, 1906)	Hibernates in caves	Throughout, including Jeju	I: Near threatened; K: Uncommon
Daubenton's bat (물윗수염박쥐)	Myotis daubentonii (Kuhl, 1817)	Near water	Throughout, including Jeju	I: Least concern; K: Uncommon
Hodgson's bat (오렌지윗수염박쥐)	Myotis formosus (Hodgson, 1835)		Scattered throughout; not found on Jeju	I: Least concern; K: Vulnerable
Fraternal myotis (긴꼬리윗수염박쥐)	Myotis frater (G.M. Allen, 1923)	Forests	Northern Korea.	I: Near threatened; K: Very rare
Ikonnikov's bat (작은윗수염박쥐)	Myotis ikonnikovi (Ognev, 1912)		Scattered throughout, including Jeju	I: Least concern; K: Very rare
Eastern long-fingered bat (큰발윗수염박쥐)	Myotis macrodactylus (Temminck, 1840)		Local throughout, including Jeju	I: Least concern; K: Abundant
Whiskered bat (윗수염박쥐)	Myotis mystacinus (Kuhl, 1817)	Forests	Scattered throughout, including Jeju and Ulleungdo	I: Least concern
Birdlike noctule (멧박쥐)	Nyctalus aviator (Thomas, 1911)		Scattered throughout	I: Near threatened; K: Rare
Java pipistrelle (큰집박쥐)	Pipistrellus javanicus (Gray, 1838)		Scattered throughout	I: Least concern; K: Common
Brown long-eared bat (토끼박쥐)	Plecotus auritus (Linnaeus, 1758)	High mountains	The Taebaek Mountains and the Paektusan area in northern North Korea	I: Least concern; K: Vulnerable
Particoloured bat (북방애기박쥐)	Vespertilio murinus (Linnaeus, 1758)	High forest and grassland in the summer	North Hamgyong, North Korea	I: Least concern; K: Very rare
Asian particolored bat (안주애기박쥐)	Vespertilio superans (Thomas, 1899)		West central Korea.	I: Least concern; K: Very rare

== Order Lagomorpha: lagomorphs ==
Common name (Korean name)	Species (authority)	Preferred habitat	Range	Status
Family Leporidae: leporids
Korean hare (멧토끼)	Lepus coreanus (Thomas, 1892)	Widespread at low altitudes.	Throughout mainland.	I: Least concern; K: Common; SK: Game
Manchurian hare (북방토끼)	Lepus mandschuricus (Radde, 1861)	High rocky forest	Northern Korea	I: Least concern; K: Common
Family Ochotonidae: pikas
Northern pika (우는토끼)	Ochotona hyperborea (Pallas, 1811)	Alpine meadows, 1000–2500 m.	Northern Korea	I: Least concern; K: Common

== Order Primates: prosimians and simians ==
Common name (Korean name)	Species (authority)	Preferred habitat	Range	Status
Family Hominidae: great apes
Human (사람)	Homo sapiens (Linnaeus, 1758)	Widespread	Throughout	I: Least concern; K: Very abundant

== Order Rodentia: rodents ==
Common name (Korean name)	Species (authority)	Preferred habitat	Range	Status
Family Muridae: murids
Striped field mouse (등줄쥐)	Apodemus agrarius (Pallas, 1771)	Widespread	Throughout, including Jeju	I: Least concern; K: Abundant
Jeju striped field mouse (제주등줄쥐)	Apodemus chejuensis (Jones & Johnson, 1965)	Widespread	Found only on Jeju	I: No assessment; J: Very abundant
Korean field mouse (흰넓적다리붉은쥐)	Apodemus peninsulae (Thomas, 1907)	Forest verges and brushland	Throughout mainland	I: Least concern; K: Common
Eurasian harvest mouse (멧밭쥐)	Micromys minutus (Pallas, 1771)	Low grasslands and fields	Throughout; not found on Ulleungdo	I: Near threatened; K: Abundant
House mouse (생쥐)	Mus musculus (Linnaeus, 1758)	Human dwellings	Throughout	I: Least concern; K: Abundant
Brown rat (집쥐)	Rattus norvegicus (Berkenhout, 1769)	Urban and cultivated areas	Throughout	I: Least concern; K: Very abundant
Black rat (애급쥐)	Rattus rattus (Linnaeus, 1758)	Urban areas	Central and southern Korea	I: Least concern; K: Invasive
Family Cricetidae: cricetids
Northern red-backed vole (숲들쥐)	Myodes rutilus (Pallas, 1779)	High, dense mixed forest	Far northeastern Korea	I: Least concern; K: Abundant
Grey red-backed vole (대륙밭쥐)	Myodes rufocanus (Sundevall, 1846)	Boreal forest	Northern Korea	I: Least concern; K: Abundant
Chinese striped hamster (비단털등줄쥐)	Cricetulus barabensis (Pallas, 1773)	Fields	Sinuiju and Cholsan, North Korea	I: Least concern; K: Uncommon
Royal vole (비단털들쥐)	Craseomys regulus (Thomas, 1907)	Widespread; avoids deep forest	Southern, central and northwestern Korea	I: Least concern; K: Common
Mandarin vole (쇠갈밭쥐)	Lasiopodomys mandarinus (Milne-Edwards, 1871)	Grassy wetlands	Southwestern Korea	I: Least concern; K: Rare
Reed vole (갈밭쥐)	Microtus fortis (Büchner, 1889)	High fields and forest verges	Western and northern Korea	I: Least concern; K: Locally abundant
Muskrat (사향쥐)	Ondatra zibethicus (Linnaeus, 1766)	Marshes and lakes	Tumen River basin, North Korea.	I: Least concern; K: Invasive
Greater long-tailed hamster (비단털쥐)	Tscherskia triton (de Winton, 1899)	Widespread	Throughout, including Jeju	I: Least concern; K: Common
Family Myocastoridae: coypu
Coypu (뉴트리아)	Myocastor coypus (Molina, 1782)	Wetlands	South Korea's Yeongnam region (Introduced for farming in the 1990s)	I: Least concern; K: Invasive
Family Sciuridae: squirrels
Siberian flying squirrel (하늘다람쥐)	Pteromys volans (Linnaeus, 1758)	Boreal forest	Far northeast and Taebaek Mountains	I: Least Concern; K: Endangered
Red squirrel (청설모)	Sciurus vulgaris (Linnaeus, 1758)	Forests	Throughout mainland	I: Least concern; SK: Vermin
Siberian chipmunk (다람쥐)	Tamias sibiricus (Laxmann, 1769)	Forests	Inland throughout	I: Least concern; SK: Vermin.
Family Dipodidae: jumping mice
Long-tailed birch mouse (긴꼬리꼬마쥐)	Sicista caudata (Thomas, 1907)	Riparian zones and wetlands	Northeastern Korea	I: Endangered; K: Rare

== See also ==
- List of mammals in North Korea
- List of mammals in South Korea

== References and further reading ==
- Bergsten, C. Fred; In-bŏm Chʻoe (2003). The Korean Diaspora in the World Economy. Washington, DC: Peterson Institute. ISBN 0-88132-358-6.
- Han Sang-hun (한상훈) (1998). "사라져가는 한국의 야생 포유동물 [Sarajeoganeun Hangugui yasaeng poyudongmul / Korea's vanishing wild mammals]". Archived from the original on 2007-09-27.
- Won, Pyong-Hooi (원병희) (1967). 한국동식물도감, 7권: 포유류 [Hanguk dongsingmul dogam 7gwon: poyuryu / Guide to Korea's plants and animals, vol. 7: Mammalia]. Seoul: Ministry of Culture and Education.
- 윤명희, 한상훈; 오홍식, 김장근; Won, Byeong-o (원병오) (2004). 한국의 포유동물 [Hangugui poyudongmul] [English title: The Mammals of Korea]. Seoul: Dongbang Media. ISBN 89-8457-310-8.
- Won, Changman; Kimberly G. Smith (1999). "History and current status of mammals of the Korean Peninsula". Mammal Review. 29 (1). Mammal Society: 3–36. Bibcode:1999MamRv..29....3W. doi:10.1046/j.1365-2907.1999.00034.x.
