= List of mammals of South Korea =

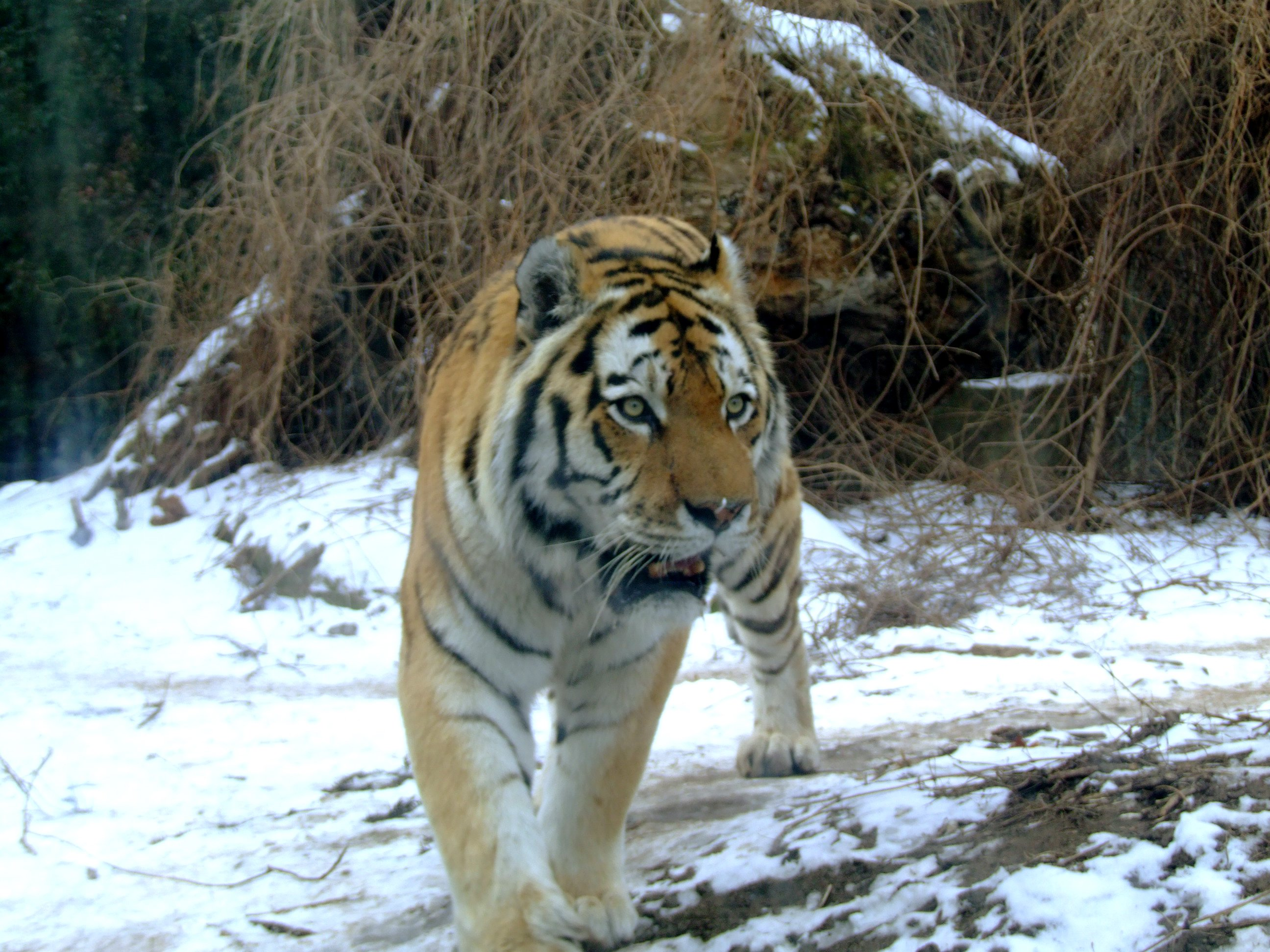
The Siberian tiger is the national animal of the South Korea.

This is a list of the mammal species recorded in South Korea. There are eighty-five mammal species in South Korea, of which six are endangered, six are vulnerable, and two are near threatened. One of the species listed for South Korea is considered to be extinct. The national animal of South Korea is the Siberian tiger.

The following tags are used to highlight each species' conservation status as assessed by the International Union for Conservation of Nature:

EX	Extinct	No reasonable doubt that the last individual has died.
EW	Extinct in the wild	Known only to survive in captivity or as a naturalized populations well outside its previous range.
CR	Critically endangered	The species is in imminent risk of extinction in the wild.
EN	Endangered	The species is facing an extremely high risk of extinction in the wild.
VU	Vulnerable	The species is facing a high risk of extinction in the wild.
NT	Near threatened	The species does not meet any of the criteria that would categorise it as risking extinction but it is likely to do so in the future.
LC	Least concern	There are no current identifiable risks to the species.
DD	Data deficient	There is inadequate information to make an assessment of the risks to this species.

Some species were assessed using an earlier set of criteria. Species assessed using this system have the following instead of near threatened and least concern categories:

LR/cd	Lower risk/conservation dependent	Species which were the focus of conservation programmes and may have moved into a higher risk category if that programme was discontinued.
LR/nt	Lower risk/near threatened	Species which are close to being classified as vulnerable but are not the subject of conservation programmes.
LR/lc	Lower risk/least concern	Species for which there are no identifiable risks.

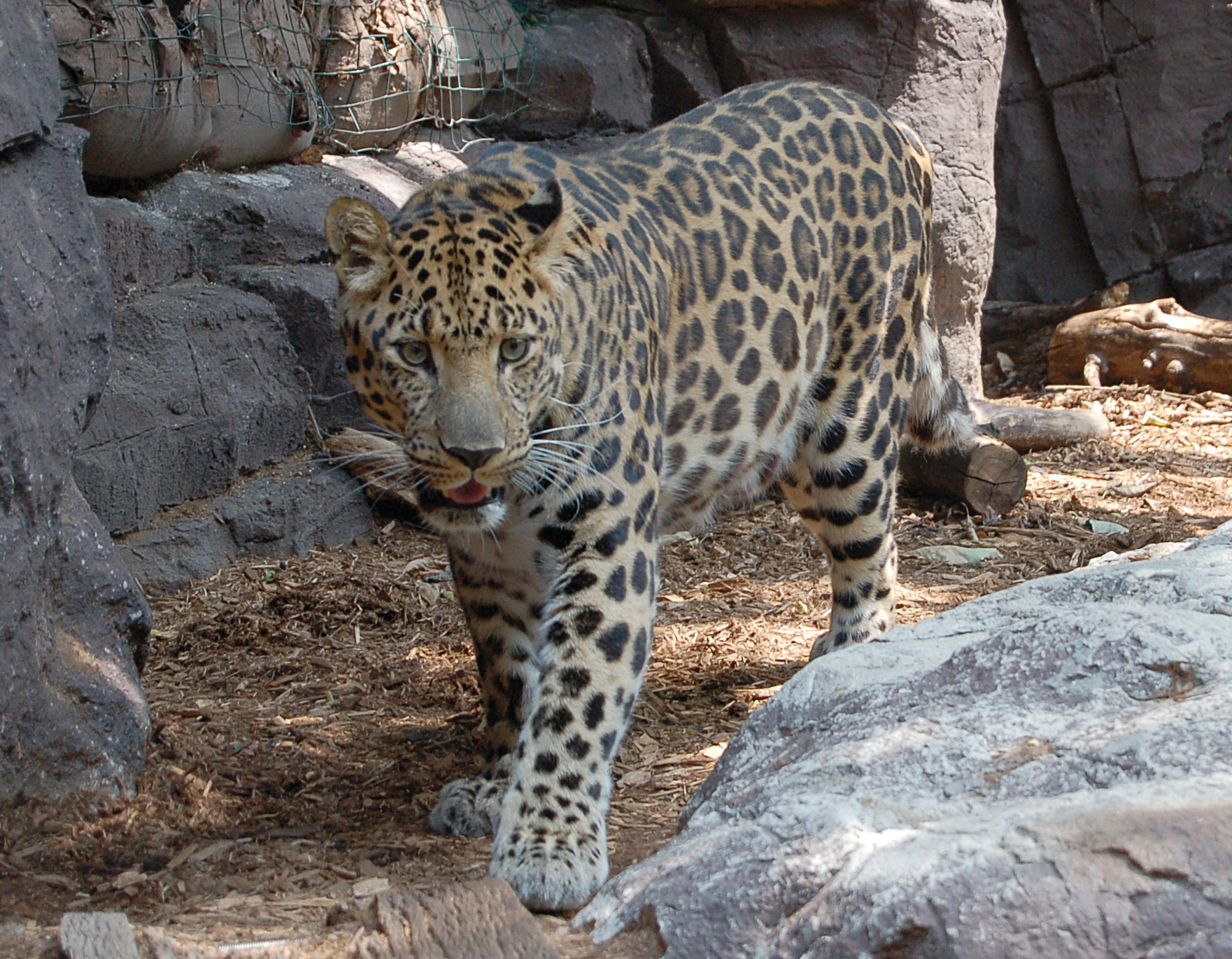
Once common throughout Korea, the Amur leopard is now extirpated in South Korea.

== Order: Rodentia (rodents) ==
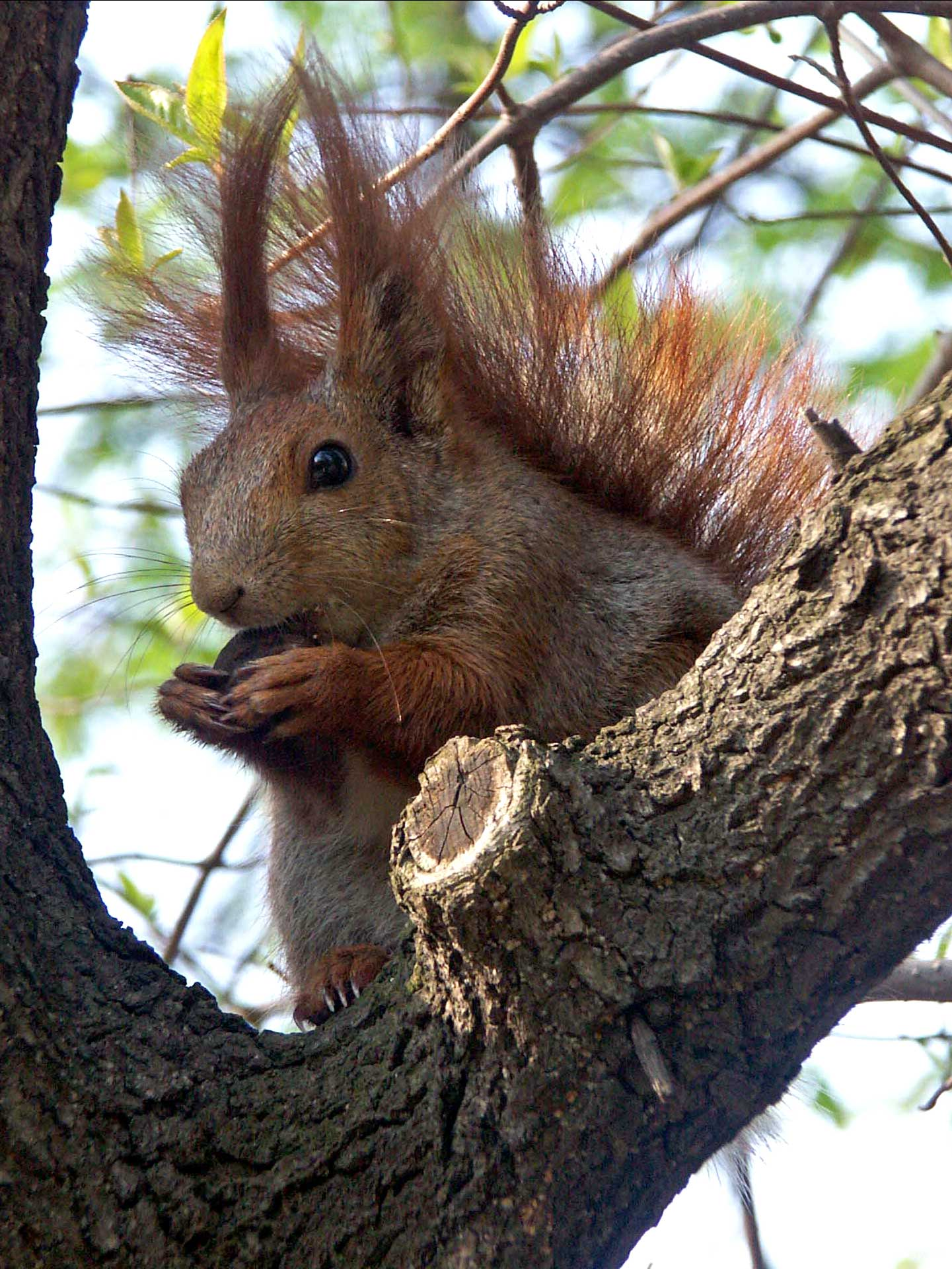
Red squirrel

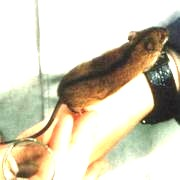
Striped field mouse

Rodents make up the largest order of mammals, with over 40% of mammalian species. They have two incisors in the upper and lower jaw which grow continually and must be kept short by gnawing. Most rodents are small though the capybara can weigh up to 45 kg (99 lb).

- Suborder: Sciurognathi
  - Family: Sciuridae (squirrels)
    - Subfamily: Sciurinae
      - Tribe: Sciurini
        - Genus: Sciurus
          - Red squirrel, S. vulgaris LC
      - Tribe: Pteromyini
        - Genus: Pteromys
          - Siberian flying squirrel, P. volans LR/nt
    - Subfamily: Xerinae
      - Tribe: Marmotini
        - Genus: Eutamias
          - Siberian chipmunk, E. sibiricus LR/lc
  - Family: Cricetidae
    - Subfamily: Cricetinae
      - Genus: Cricetulus
        - Chinese striped hamster, C. barabensis LR/lc
      - Genus: Tscherskia
        - Greater long-tailed hamster, T. triton LR/lc
    - Subfamily: Arvicolinae
      - Genus: Clethrionomys
        - Gray red-backed vole, C. rufocanus LR/lc
        - Northern red-backed vole, C. rutilus LR/lc
      - Genus: Eothenomys
        - Royal vole, E. regulus LR/lc
  - Family: Muridae (mice, rats, voles, gerbils, hamsters, etc.)
    - Subfamily: Murinae
      - Genus: Apodemus
        - Striped field mouse, A. agrarius LR/lc
        - Korean field mouse, A. peninsulae LR/lc
      - Genus: Micromys
        - Harvest mouse, M. minutus LR/nt
      - Genus: Rattus
        - Tanezumi rat, R. tanezumi LR/lc

== Order: Lagomorpha (lagomorphs) ==
The lagomorphs comprise two families, Leporidae (hares and rabbits), and Ochotonidae (pikas). Though they can resemble rodents, and were classified as a superfamily in that order until the early 20th century, they have since been considered a separate order. They differ from rodents in a number of physical characteristics, such as having four incisors in the upper jaw rather than two.

- Family: Leporidae (rabbits, hares)
  - Genus: Lepus
    - Korean hare, L. coreanus LR/lc

== Order: Erinaceomorpha (hedgehogs and gymnures) ==
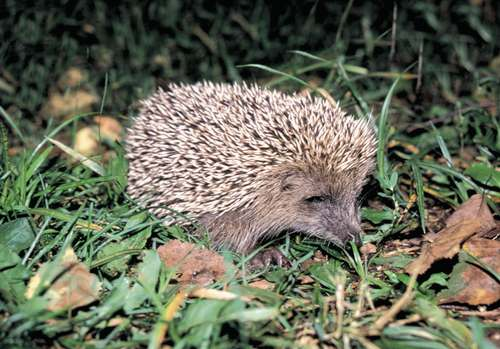
Amur hedgehog

The order Erinaceomorpha contains a single family, Erinaceidae, which comprise the hedgehogs and gymnures. The hedgehogs are easily recognised by their spines while gymnures look more like large rats.

- Family: Erinaceidae (hedgehogs)
  - Subfamily: Erinaceinae
    - Genus: Erinaceus
      - Amur hedgehog, E. amurensis LR/lc

== Order: Soricomorpha (shrews, moles, and solenodons) ==
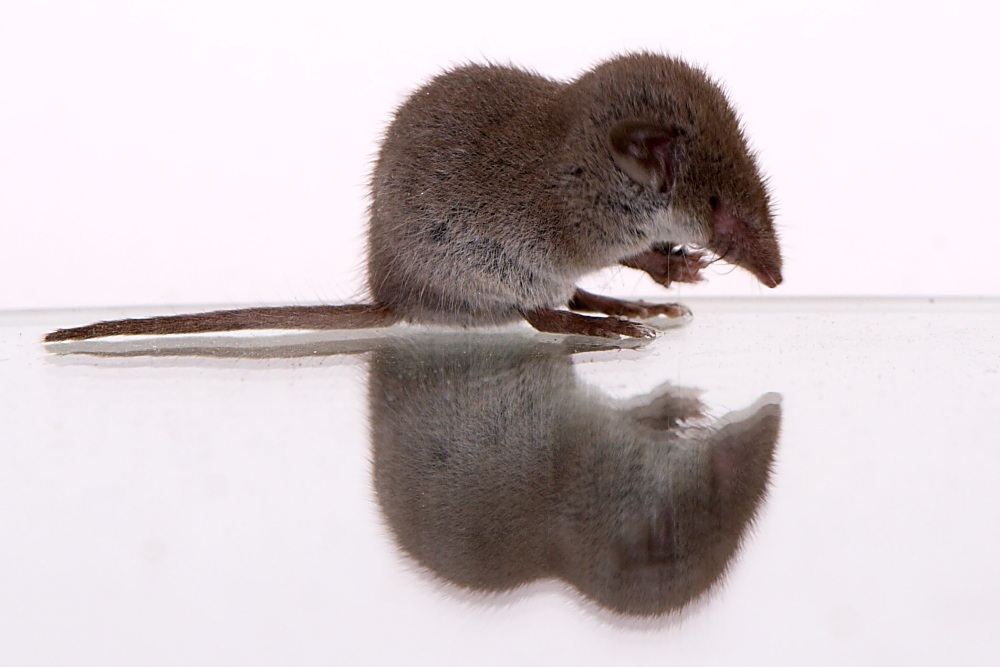
Lesser white-toothed shrew

The "shrew-forms" are insectivorous mammals. Shrews and solenodons closely resemble mice, while moles are stout-bodied burrowers.

- Family: Soricidae (shrews)
  - Subfamily: Crocidurinae
    - Genus: Crocidura
      - Dsinezumi shrew, C. dsinezumi LR/lc
      - Ussuri white-toothed shrew, C. lasiura LR/lc
      - Lesser white-toothed shrew, C. suaveolens LR/lc
  - Subfamily: Soricinae
    - Tribe: Soricini
      - Genus: Sorex
        - Laxmann's shrew, S. caecutiens LR/lc
        - Taiga shrew, S. isodon LR/lc
        - Eurasian least shrew, S. minutissimus LR/lc
- Family: Talpidae (moles)
  - Subfamily: Talpinae
    - Tribe: Talpini
      - Genus: Mogera
        - Large mole, M. robusta LR/lc

== Order: Chiroptera (bats) ==
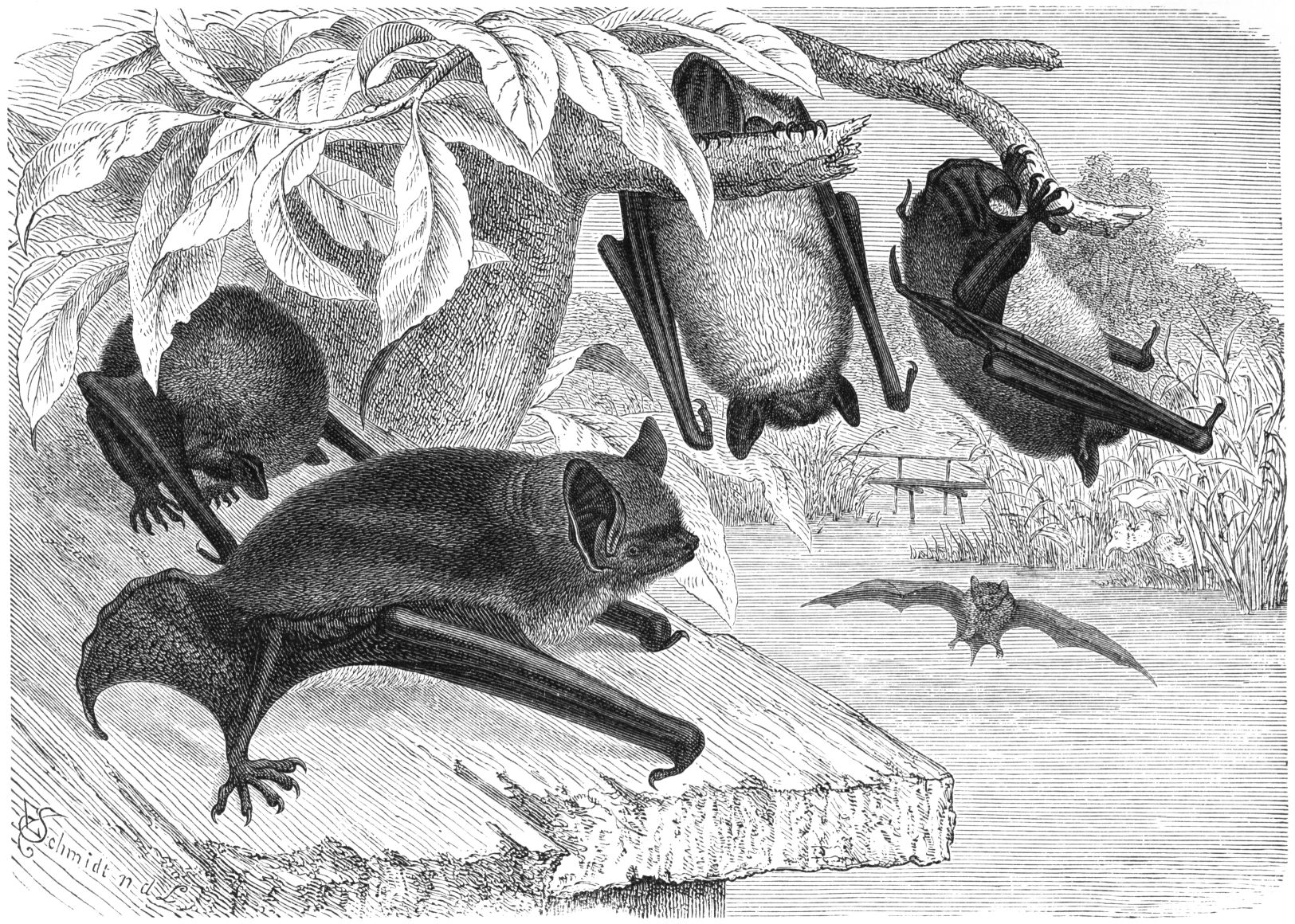
Daubenton's bats

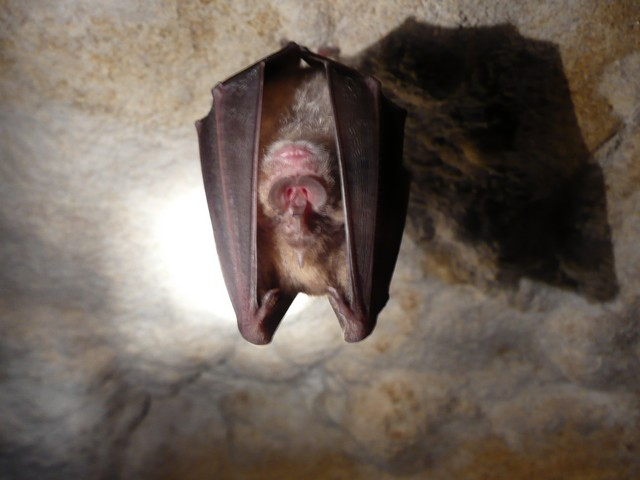
Greater horseshoe bat

The bats' most distinguishing feature is that their forelimbs are developed as wings, making them the only mammals capable of flight. Bat species account for about 20% of all mammals.

- Family: Vespertilionidae
  - Subfamily: Myotinae
    - Genus: Myotis
      - Daubenton's bat, M. daubentonii LR/lc
      - Hodgson's bat, M. formosus LR/lc
      - Fraternal myotis, M. frater LR/nt
      - Whiskered bat, M. mystacinus LR/lc
  - Subfamily: Vespertilioninae
    - Genus: Eptesicus
      - Kobayashi's bat, E. kobayashii DD
      - Northern bat, E. nilssoni LR/lc
    - Genus: Hypsugo
      - Savi's pipistrelle, H. savii LR/lc
    - Genus: Nyctalus
      - Birdlike noctule, N.s aviator LR/nt
    - Genus: Plecotus
      - Brown long-eared bat, P. auritus LR/lc
    - Genus: Vespertilio
      - Asian parti-colored bat, V, superans LR/lc
  - Subfamily: Murininae
    - Genus: Murina
      - Greater tube-nosed bat, M. leucogaster LR/lc
      - Ussuri tube-nosed bat, M. ussuriensis EN
  - Subfamily: Miniopterinae
    - Genus: Miniopterus
      - Schreibers' long-fingered bat, M. schreibersii LC
- Family: Molossidae
  - Genus: Tadarida
    - European free-tailed bat, T. teniotis LR/lc
- Family: Rhinolophidae
  - Subfamily: Rhinolophinae
    - Genus: Rhinolophus
      - Greater horseshoe bat, R. ferrumequinum LR/nt

== Order: Cetacea (whales, dolphins, and porpoises) ==
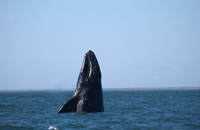
Western gray whale

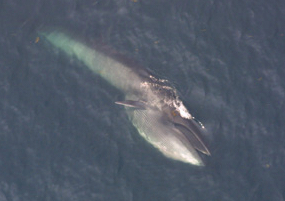
Sei whale

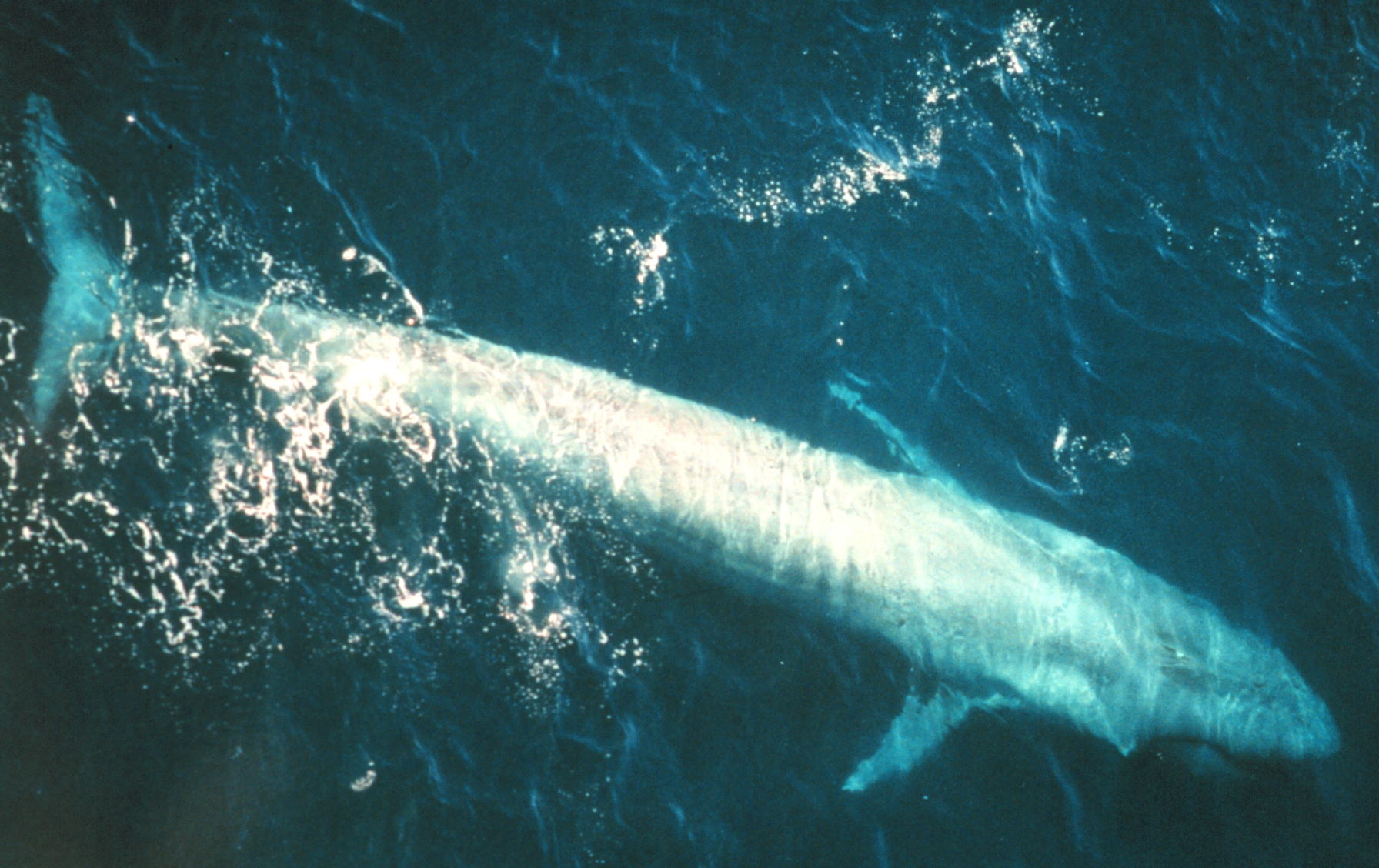
Blue whale

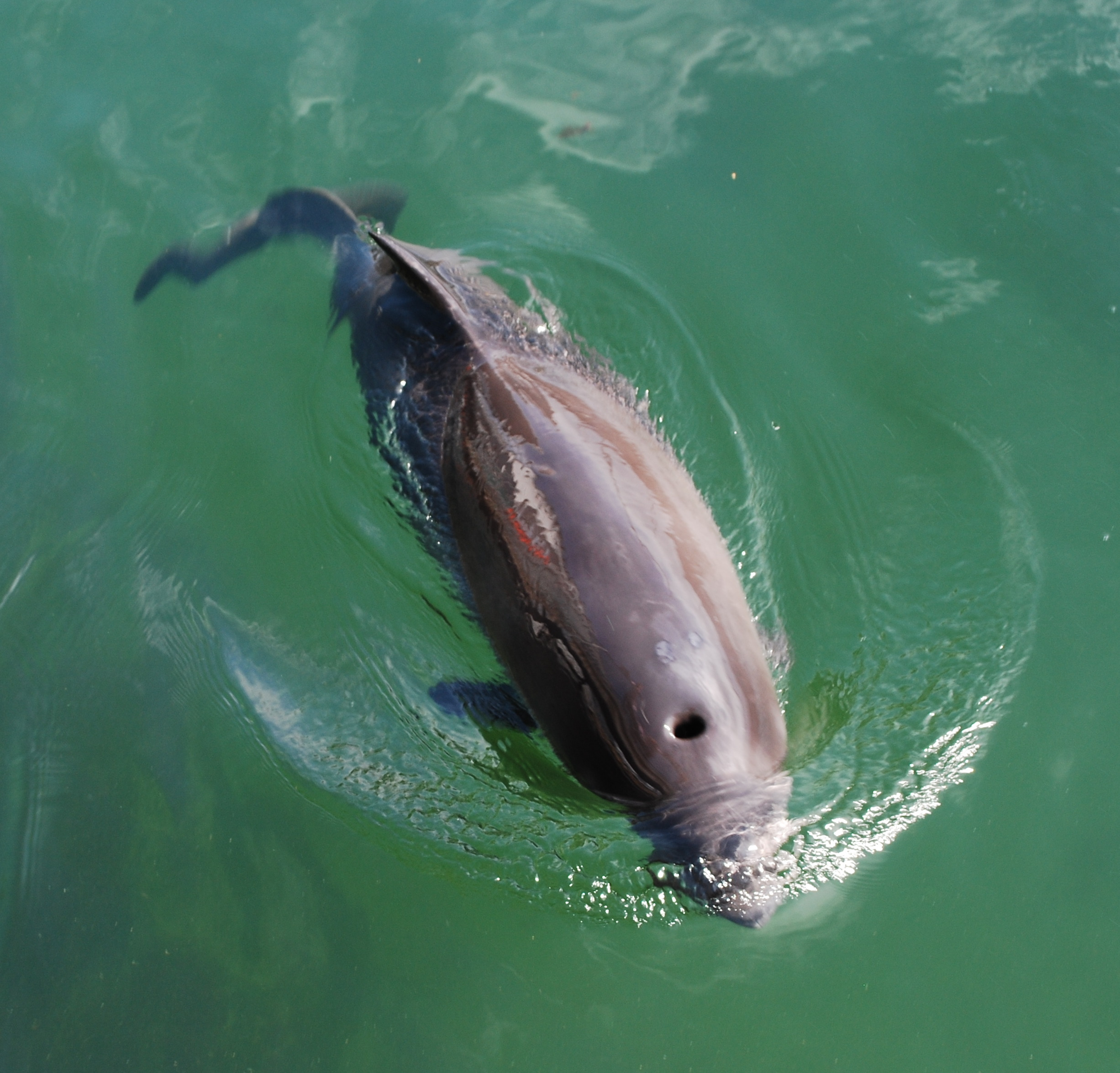
Harbor porpoise

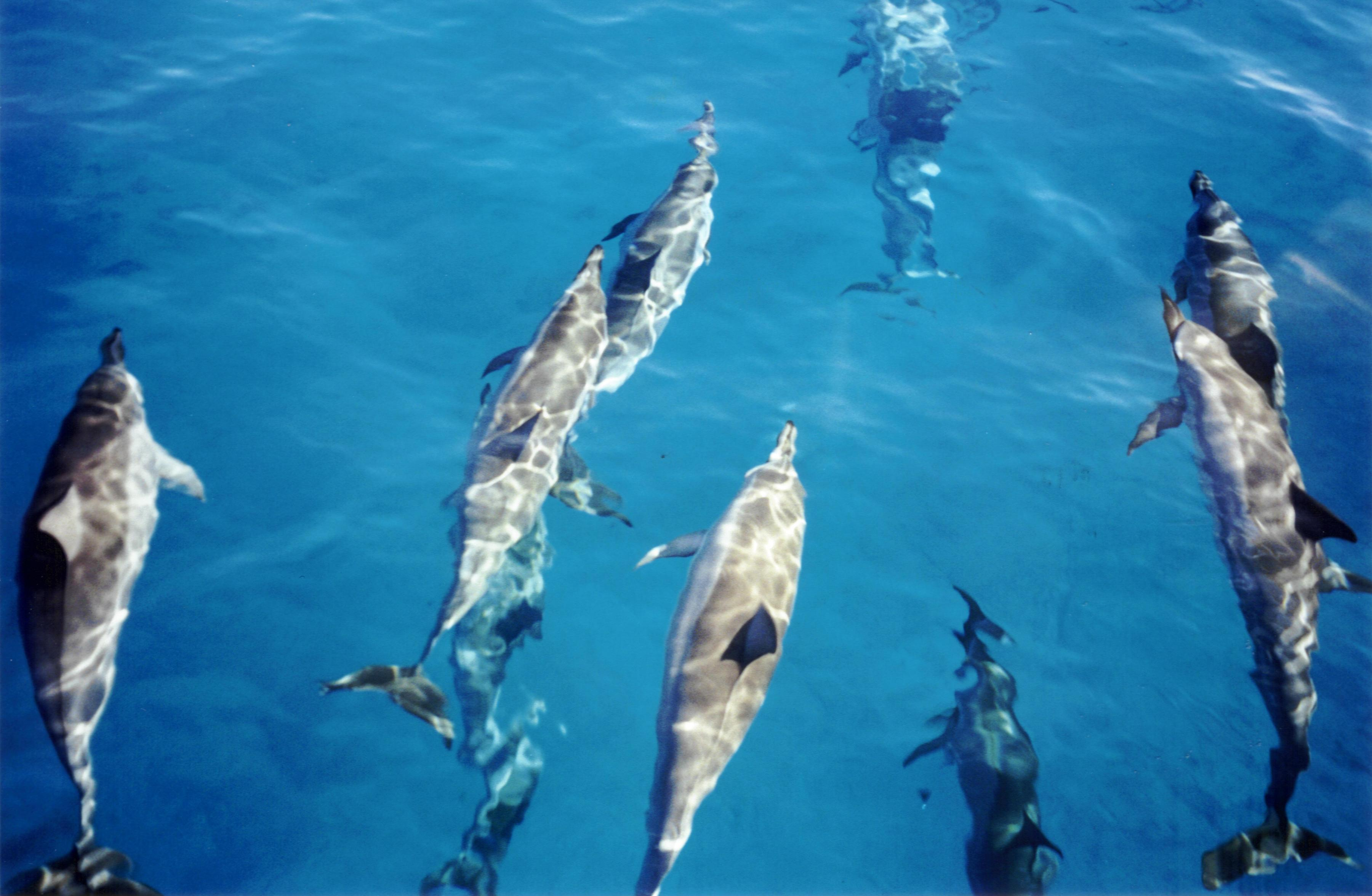
Spinner dolphins

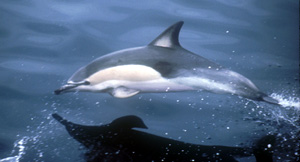
Short-beaked common dolphin

Orcas

The order Cetacea includes whales, dolphins and porpoises. They are the mammals most fully adapted to aquatic life with a spindle-shaped nearly hairless body, protected by a thick layer of blubber, and forelimbs and tail modified to provide propulsion underwater.

- Suborder: Mysticeti
  - Family: Balaenidae
    - Genus: Balaena
      - Bowhead whale, Balaena mysticetus (Sea of Okhotsk) EN
    - Genus: Eubalaena
      - North Pacific right whale, Eubalaena japonica CR
  - Family: Eschrichtiidae
    - Genus: Eschrichtius
      - Western gray whale, Eschrichtius robustus CR
  - Family: Balaenopteridae
    - Subfamily: Megapterinae
      - Genus: Megaptera
        - Humpback whale, Megaptera novaeangliae (Sea of Japan and Yellow/Bohai Seas) EN
    - Subfamily: Balaenopterinae
      - Genus: Balaenoptera
        - Common minke whale, Balaenoptera acutorostrata (Sea of Japan and Yellow/Bohai Seas) EN
        - Northern sei whale, Balaenoptera borealis EN
        - Bryde's whale, Balaenoptera brydi DD
        - Eden's whale, Balaenoptera edeni (East China Sea) CR
        - Northern blue whale, Balaenoptera musculus CR
        - Omura's whale, Balaenoptera omurai DD
        - Northern fin whale, Balaenoptera physalus CR
- Suborder: Odontoceti
  - Superfamily: Platanistoidea
    - Family: Phocoenidae
      - Genus: Neophocaena
        - Sunameri, Neophocaena phocaenoides phocaenoides VU
      - Genus: Phocoena
        - Harbor porpoise, Phocoena phocoena VU
      - Genus: Phocoenoides
        - Dall's porpoise, Phocoenoides dalli LR/cd
    - Family: Physeteridae
      - Genus: Physeter
        - Sperm whale, Physeter macrocephalus VU
    - Family: Kogiidae
      - Genus: Kogia
        - Pygmy sperm whale, Kogia breviceps LR/lc
        - Dwarf sperm whale, Kogia sima LR/lc
    - Family: Ziphidae
      - Subfamily: Ziphiinae
        - Genus: Ziphius
          - Cuvier's beaked whale, Ziphius cavirostris LC
      - Subfamily: Berardiinae
        - Genus: Berardius
          - Baird's beaked whale, Berardius bairdii LR/cd
      - Subfamily: Hyperoodontinae
        - Genus: Mesoplodon
          - Blainville's beaked whale, Mesoplodon densirostris DD
          - Ginkgo-toothed beaked whale, Mesoplodon ginkgodens DD
          - Stejneger's beaked whale, Mesoplodon stejnegeri DD
    - Family: Delphinidae (marine dolphins)
      - Genus: Steno
        - Rough-toothed dolphin, Steno bredanensis DD
      - Genus: Stenella
        - Pantropical spotted dolphin, Stenella attenuata LR/cd
        - Striped dolphin, Stenella coeruleoalba LR/cd
        - Spinner dolphin, Stenella longirostris LR/cd
      - Genus: Delphinus
        - Long-beaked common dolphin, Delphinus capensis LR/lc
        - Short-beaked common dolphin, Delphinus delphis LR/lc
      - Genus: Tursiops
        - Common bottlenose dolphin, Tursiops truncatus LR/lc
      - Genus: Lagenorhynchus
        - Pacific white-sided dolphin, Lagenorhynchus obliquidens LR/lc
      - Genus: Lissodelphis
        - Northern right whale dolphin, Lissodelphis borealis LR/lc
      - Genus: Grampus
        - Risso's dolphin, Grampus griseus DD
      - Genus: Feresa
        - Pygmy killer whale, Feresa attenuata DD
      - Genus: Pseudorca
        - False killer whale, Pseudorca crassidens DD
      - Genus: Orcinus
        - Killer whale, Orcinus orca (Sea of Japan and Yellow/Bohai Seas) EN
      - Genus: Globicephala
        - Short-finned pilot whale, Globicephala macrorhyncus DD

== Order: Carnivora (carnivorans) ==
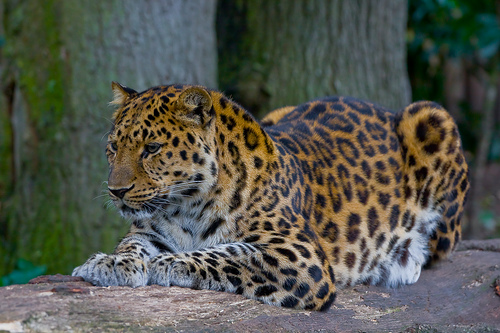
Amur leopard

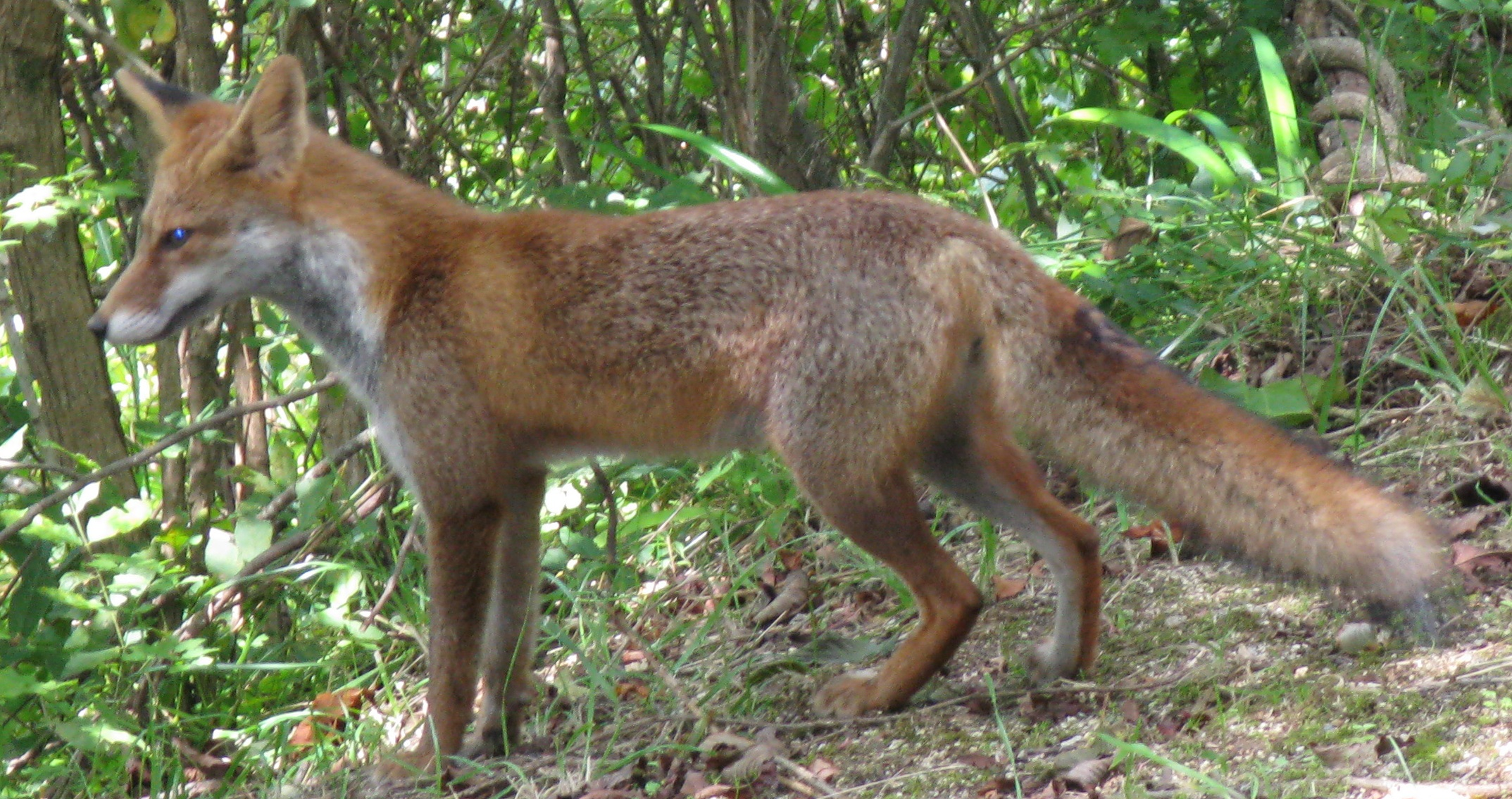
Red fox

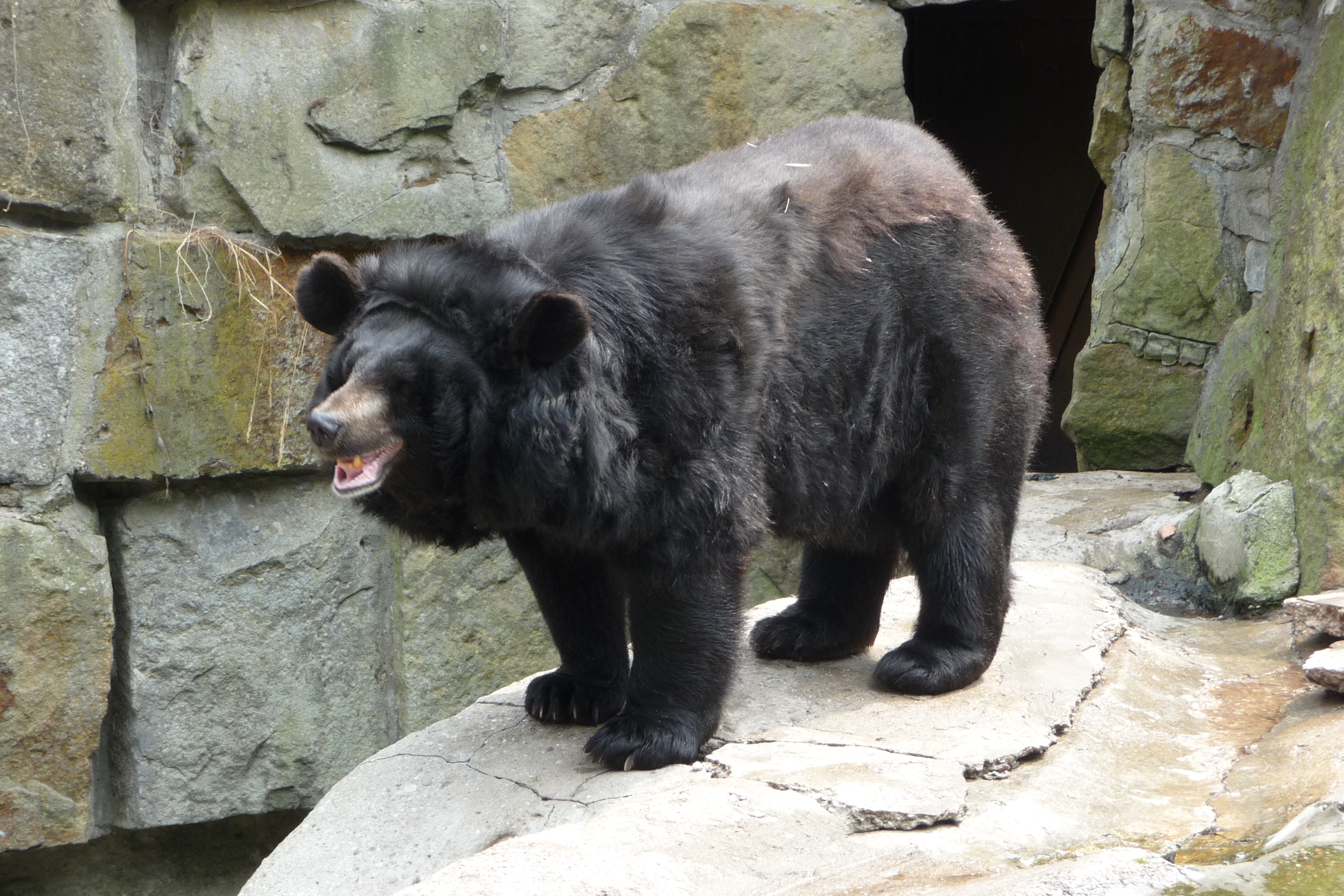
Asiatic black bear

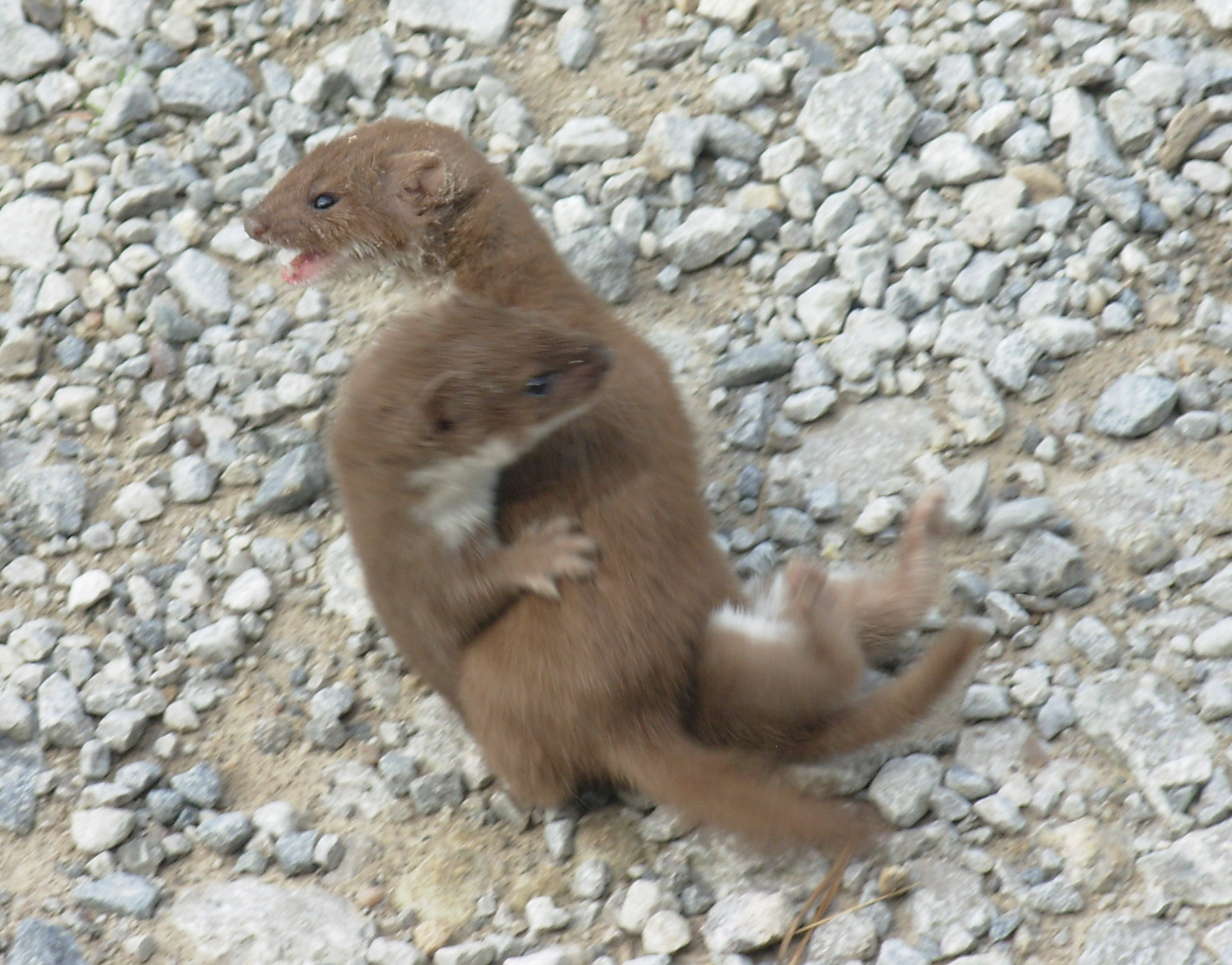
Least weasel

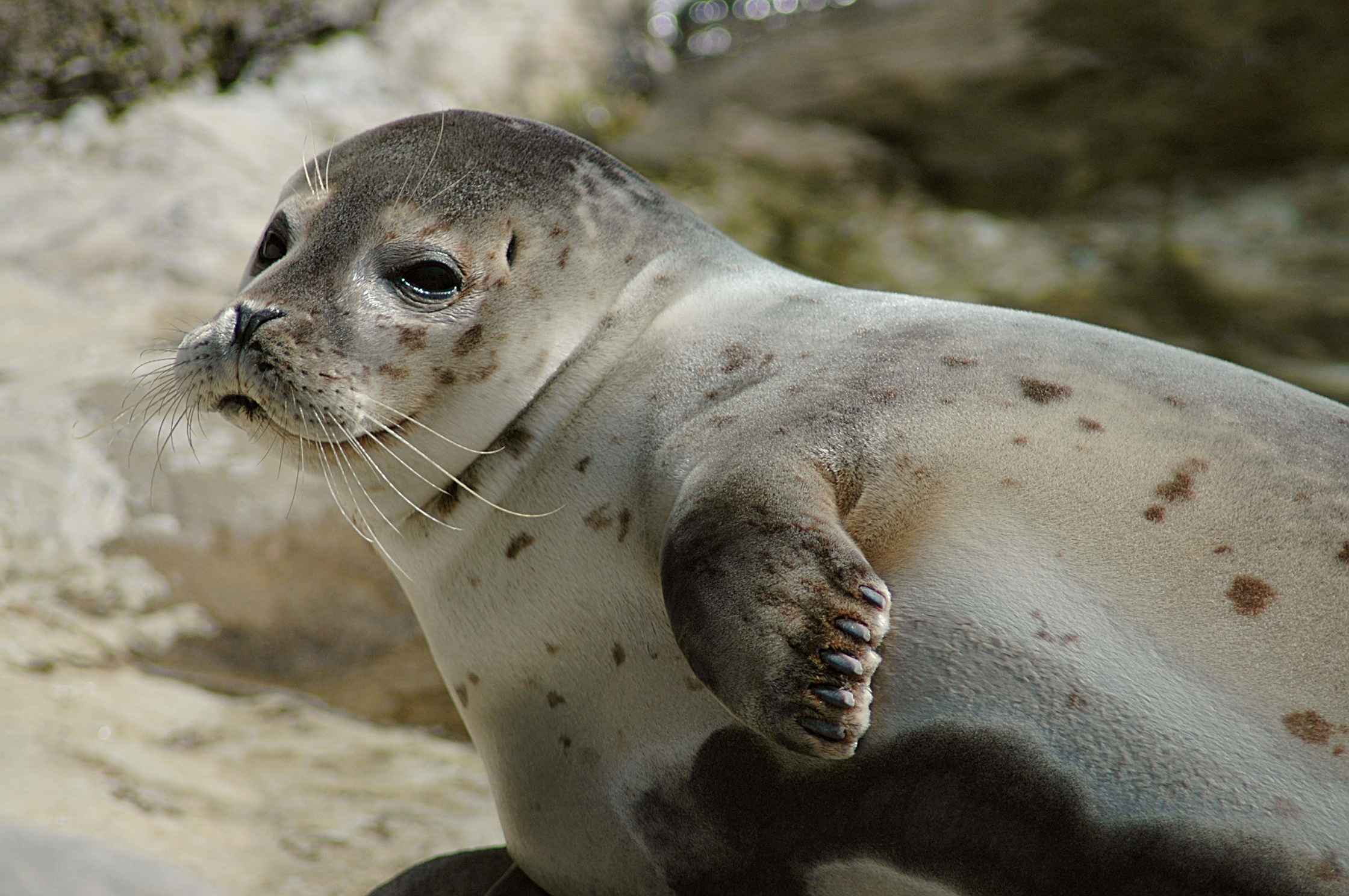
Common seal

There are over 260 species of carnivorans, the majority of which feed primarily on meat. They have a characteristic skull shape and dentition.

- Suborder: Feliformia
  - Family: Felidae (cats)
    - Subfamily: Felinae
      - Genus: Lynx
        - Eurasian lynx, L. lynx NT
      - Genus: Prionailurus
        - Leopard cat, P. bengalensis LC
    - Subfamily: Pantherinae
      - Genus: Panthera
        - Leopard, P. pardus extirpated
          - Amur leopard, P. p. orientalis CR extirpated
        - Tiger, P. tigris extirpated
          - Siberian tiger, P. t. tigris CR extirpated
- Suborder: Caniformia
  - Family: Canidae (dogs, foxes)
    - Genus: Vulpes
      - Red fox, V. vulpes possibly extirpated
        - Korean fox, V. v. peculiosa possibly extirpated
    - Genus: Nyctereutes
      - Raccoon dog, N. procyonoides LC
    - Genus: Canis (canines)
      - Grey wolf, C. lupus
        - Mongolian wolf, C. l. chanco
    - Genus: Cuon
      - Dhole, C. alpinus extirpated
        - Ussuri dhole, C. a. alpinus extirpated
  - Family: Ursidae (bears)
    - Genus: Ursus
      - Brown bear, U. arctos LC extirpated
        - Ussuri brown bear, U. a. lasiotus extirpated
      - Asiatic black bear, U. thibetanus VU
  - Family: Mustelidae (mustelids)
    - Genus: Lutra
      - European otter, L. lutra NT
    - Genus: Martes
      - Yellow-throated marten, M. flavigula LR/lc
    - Genus: Meles
      - Asian badger, M. leucurus LR/lc
    - Genus: Mustela
      - Least weasel, M. nivalis LR/lc
      - Siberian weasel, M. sibirica LR/lc
  - Family: Otariidae (eared seals, sealions)
    - Genus: Callorhinus
      - Northern fur seal, C. ursinus VU, vagrant
    - Genus: Eumetopias
      - Steller sea lion, E. jubatus NT, vagrant
    - Genus: Zalophus
      - Japanese sea lion, Z. japonicus EX
  - Family: Phocidae (earless seals)
    - Genus: Phoca
      - Spotted seal, P. largha CR
      - Common seal, P. vitulina LR/lc
    - Genus: Pusa
      - Ringed seal, P. hispida LR/lc

== Order: Artiodactyla (even-toed ungulates) ==
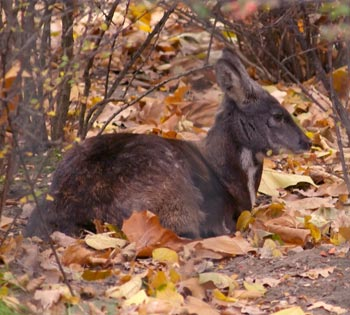
Siberian musk deer

The even-toed ungulates are ungulates whose weight is borne about equally by the third and fourth toes, rather than mostly or entirely by the third as in perissodactyls. There are about 220 artiodactyl species, including many that are of great economic importance to humans.

- Family: Suidae (pigs)
  - Subfamily: Suinae
    - Genus: Sus
      - Wild boar, S. scrofa LR/lc
- Family: Moschidae
  - Genus: Moschus
    - Siberian musk deer, M. moschiferus VU
- Family: Cervidae (deer)
  - Subfamily: Cervinae
    - Genus: Cervus
      - Elk, C. canadensis LC
        - Manchurian wapiti, C. c. xanthopygus extirpated
      - Sika deer, C. nippon LC
        - Manchurian sika deer, C. n. mantchuricus extirpated
        - Formosan sika deer, C. n. taiouanus, introduced
  - Subfamily: Hydropotinae
    - Genus: Hydropotes
      - Water deer, H. inermis LR/nt
  - Subfamily: Capreolinae
    - Genus: Capreolus
      - Siberian roe deer, C. pygargus LR/lc
- Family: Bovidae (cattle, antelope, sheep, goats)
  - Subfamily: Caprinae
    - Genus: Nemorhaedus
      - Long-tailed goral, N. caudatus VU
  - Subfamily: Bovinae
    - Genus: Bos
      - Aurochs, B. primigenius EX

== See also ==
- List of mammals of Korea
- Wildlife of Korea
- List of mammals of North Korea
- List of chordate orders
- Lists of mammals by region
- Mammal classification
