= Deraniyagala's beaked whale =

Conservation status
- Data Deficient (IUCN 3.1)
- CITES Appendix II

Scientific classification
- Kingdom: Animalia
- Phylum: Chordata
- Class: Mammalia
- Order: Artiodactyla
- Infraorder: Cetacea
- Family: Ziphiidae
- Genus: Mesoplodon
- Species: M. hotaula

Binomial name
- Mesoplodon hotaula P. E. P. Deraniyagala, 1963

Species of mammal

Deraniyagala's beaked whale (Mesoplodon hotaula) is a species of mesoplodont whale closely related to the ginkgo-toothed beaked whale.

== Taxonomy ==
Deraniyagala's beaked whale was initially known from seven stranded individuals. The first sighting was recorded by Paules Edward Pieris Deraniyagala in 1963 and the newly discovered species was named after him. Two years later, controversy ensued over whether these stranded specimens were actually ginkgo-toothed beaked whales. The debate was resolved in the early 2000s after M. ginkgodens and M. hotaula were differentiated maternally by mitochondrial DNA, biparentally by autosomal, and paternally through Y chromosome inherited DNA sequences, as well as by morphological features. Their control region, cytochrome b, cytochrome oxidase, and various introns taken for genetic analysis demonstrated that genetic variance (Dα) of the cytochrome b between Deraniyagala's whale and the ginkgo-toothed beaked whale was 8.2% ± 1.79%, whereas genetic variance range between 5.5% to 16.6% in other Mesoplodon species (the smaller the percentage, the lesser the genetic differences between the two species).

== Distribution ==
Deraniyagala's beaked whale is known from only seven individuals that have stranded themselves on beaches of various islands in the Indian and South Pacific Oceans: Seychelles, Maldives, Sri Lanka, Gilbert Islands, Kiribati and Line Islands. Observed distributions of M. hotaula strandings suggest that they prefer tropical habitats, as opposed to their closest known relative, the ginkgo-toothed beaked whale. It is thought that, like Cuvier's beaked whale, they live in insular populations (isolated communities).

A potential sighting occurred in the South China Sea in May 2019, although it was possible the sighted whales were ginkgo-toothed beaked whales.

== Anatomy ==
Deraniyagala's beaked whale is on the smaller side for a mesoplodont. Although mean and maximum sizes are uncertain due to small sample size, from the 2019 sighting and stranded specimens it appears that adult Deraniyagala's beaked whales are between 4–5 m (13–16 ft) in length. It does not appear that adult males are larger than adult females.

Like many other marine organisms, Deraniyagala's beaked whale exhibits countershading. Blue-black and brown black dorsal coloration have both been observed with lighter shading on the underbelly. A pale, mottled cheek and white lower lip has been identified as a key indicator of the species. The eyes are situated about half a beak's length from the back end of the mouth, and a small, curved dorsal fin is situated two-thirds of the way along the body. Other indicative anatomical features of Mesoplodon hotaula include various tooth and mandible features.

== Behavior ==
Beaked whales such as M. hotaula are suction feeders. They create a low-pressure environment in their oral cavity to suck prey towards their mouth. Due to this specialized feeding method, beaked whales have lost most of their teeth. After using suction to capture prey, they rely on simple sieving to keep the prey inside their mouth while expelling water.

Beaked whales like Deraniyagala's beaked whale have a complex foraging mechanism which involves the use of echolocation clicks to locate deep-water squid and fish during their foraging dives, and then use buzzes to capture their prey. There are different phases of acoustic behavior that beaked whales exhibit during foraging dives. The first phase is the search phase, where the whales emit regular clicks with varying echo returns as they pass through clouds of potential prey. The second phase is the approach phase, where the whale focuses on a specific target and continuously ensonifies it, receiving echoes until the transition to the final phase. The final phase is called the terminal phase, characterized by a rapid increase in click rate known as the buzz, followed by the interception of the prey through a sharp turn and increased acceleration.

The social structure of mesoplodonts is not well understood but it appears that smaller species live in groups with a single mature male and females with their young, although larger groups have occasionally been observed as well. Older males with scars may be seen with different groups of females, indicating that they may fight for access to females using their teeth. Stranded adult males of Deraniyagala's beaked whales have been found with chipped teeth that suggest combat with other adult males. A possible explanation for this may be that male beaked whales fight other males of the same species for control of a group of females.

Deraniyagala's beaked whale can also stay underwater for hours before surfacing to breathe. In 2019, a group of researchers observed beaked whales taking 3 short dives of between 14 and 18 minutes, briefly surfacing in between for 1–5 minutes. Then, after a fourth dive, the whales stayed submerged for 1.8 hours before resurfacing. This suggests that like most other mesoplodonts, Deraniyagala's beaked whale is capable of staying submerged for hours at a time.

== Conservation ==
Plastic pollution is a major issue threatening the lives of beaked whales such as M. hotaula. When plastics are ingested, they can cause blockages or tears in the digestive system, preventing the animal from properly digesting food and leading to malnutrition. Plastics can also release toxins into the animal's body, causing chemical poisoning. In addition to the direct physical impacts, ingestion of plastics can also negatively affect the behavior and reproductive success of marine animals.

Other ocean debris have been mentioned as possible threats for Deraniyagala's beaked whale. The individuals suspected to be members of the species sighted in 2019 had unusual indentations on the lips, which researchers believed could have been caused by marine debris or fishing line. Additionally, a stranded individual was found in on a beach in the Philippines in 2012, and died shortly after it was found. Further examination revealed that the whale had only a black rope and a piece of coal in its stomach. Researchers believed that the consumption of these items could have led to the whale's death.

== See also ==
- List of cetaceans
