= Slender shrew =

Conservation status
- Least Concern (IUCN 3.1)

Scientific classification
- Kingdom: Animalia
- Phylum: Chordata
- Class: Mammalia
- Order: Eulipotyphla
- Family: Soricidae
- Genus: Sorex
- Species: S. gracillimus

Binomial name
- Sorex gracillimus Thomas, 1907
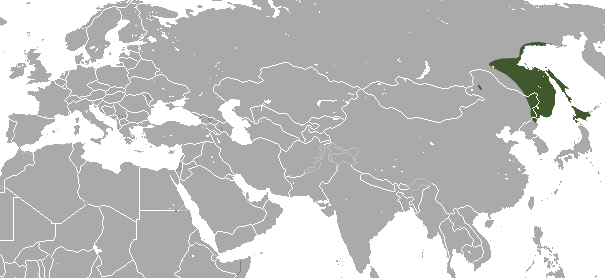
- Slender shrew range

Species of mammal

The slender shrew (Sorex gracillimus) is a species of shrew. An adult slender shrew has a weight of 1.5–5.3 g (0.053–0.187 oz) and a body length of 4.7–6.0 cm (1.9–2.4 in), with a tail of 4–5 cm (1.6–2.0 in); this makes it one of the smaller shrews found in its range. It is distributed across northeastern North Korea, Hokkaidō, and the Russian Far East including the Kuril Islands.

== See also ==
- List of mammals of Korea
