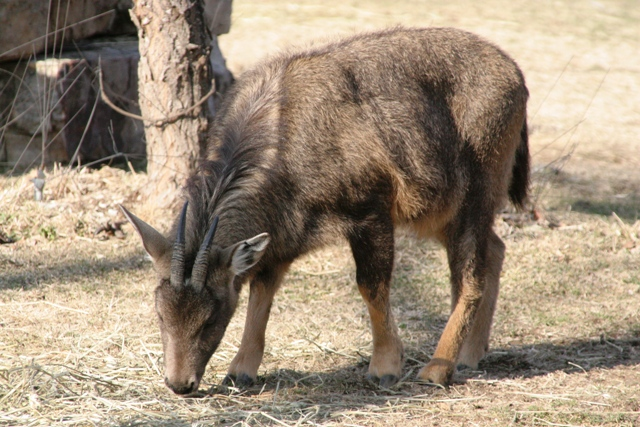
- Long-tailed goral at Saint Louis Zoo

Conservation status
- Vulnerable (IUCN 3.1)
- CITES Appendix I

Scientific classification
- Kingdom: Animalia
- Phylum: Chordata
- Class: Mammalia
- Order: Artiodactyla
- Family: Bovidae
- Subfamily: Caprinae
- Genus: Naemorhedus
- Species: N. caudatus

Binomial name
- Naemorhedus caudatus H. Milne-Edwards, 1867
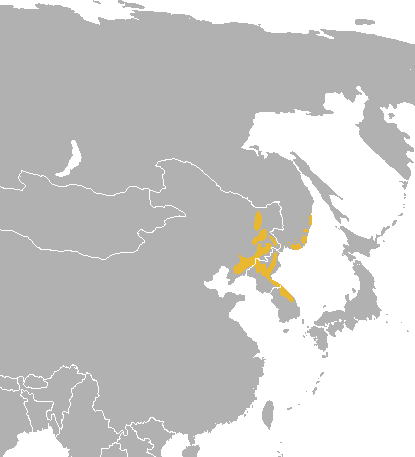
- Naemorhedus caudatus range

= Long-tailed goral =

Species of mammal

The long-tailed goral or Amur goral (Naemorhedus caudatus) is a species of ungulate of the family Bovidae found in the mountains of eastern and northern Asia, including Russia, China, and Korea. A population of this species exists in the Korean Demilitarized Zone, near the tracks of the Donghae Bukbu Line. The species is classified as endangered in South Korea, with an estimated population less than 250. It has been designated South Korean natural monument 217.

== Geographical distribution ==
The long-tailed goral (also known as the Chinese gray goral) was and is sparsely found in the wild throughout China, Russia, and Korea, as well as the Himalayas. The main population in the wild today is found in Russia where there is a population of about 600 which is in decline; in other places the populations are below 200.

In 2003, the species was reported as being present in Arunachal Pradesh, in northeast India. However, subsequent studies consider this as misidentification, probably representing a red goral instead.

== Habitat ==
The long-tailed goral prefers high elevations with rocky, dry, steep, cliff-ridden mountains. They make their homes near sparsely vegetated cliffs with small crevices where they can hide from danger. These areas are sometimes covered by evergreen and deciduous forests, and gorals are occasionally found feeding on exposed grassy ridges.

== Group size ==
The goral is a group-oriented species and lives in herds with two to 12 individuals. The groups consist of females, kids, and younger males; older males tend to be solitary.

=== Group range ===
The animals tend to stay within a 100-acre range; this can be different for males in rut. Males in rut will travel long distances over rough terrain to find as many females to fertilize as possible.

== Description ==
The long-tailed goral appears very similar to goats. Males can weigh 62–93 lb (28–42 kg) and females 49–77 lb (22–35 kg). Lengths can vary anywhere from 32 to 51 inches (82 to 130 cm) and have a shoulder height of 20 to 31 inches (51 to 79 cm). They are even-toed ungulates of the goat-antelope family. The tips of their horns curve back and have distinct rings. There are openings between their hooves. The face of a goral is flat like that of a serow, and the nose and eyes are very close together. It has brown fur with shades of gray; the outer fur is long. The bushy tail is usually dark brown or black in color. Females usually are lighter in shade than that of males; their horns are smaller than males' horns.

== Diet ==
Gorals are considered to be browsers because they eat a wide variety of grasses, woody material, and nuts and fruits. In the summer months, they tend to feed on the many grasses that grow on the mountains. Throughout the winter, they browse on woody twigs and leaves of trees and shrubs; they have been known to eat nuts, such as acorns, and a few fruits.

== Life span ==
The goral's average lifespan in the wild is 10–15 years, although a captive goral was aged at 17 years. The females will go into a 30- to 40-hour estrus cycle once per year, when they can be fertilized by a male. At the end of a 215-day gestation period, they give birth to one offspring, or very rarely twins. Breeding within the zoo systems has been successful, with the San Diego Zoo especially so.

== Conservation ==
The long-tailed goral is protected under Appendix I of CITES, and numerous reserves have been set aside, but they are not the main focus of the reserves; however, they are protected when they are on these properties. In China, the long-tailed goral is a Class II species, meaning it is protected. It is poorly enforced because of the animals' uses in traditional medicine. The only conservation effort is bringing these animals into captivity within the zoo system, which should prevent it from going extinct. Poaching of wild gorals is increasing; they are poached for their fur, meat, and horns. They are also poached because some of their parts are used in traditional medicine. Their natural predators are also affecting the population. Their predators include lynx, snow leopards, tigers, and wolves in some regions.

The agriculture business has not been kind to the goral; their habitat is being destroyed rapidly by the slash-and-burn technique — their natural habitats are being farmed and used for livestock. The domestic livestock are grazing off all the grasses, leaving nothing for the native goral to eat. They are losing space in zoos, because they are not a very well known animal. The gorals are being replaced with more popular animals, such as tigers, lions, and bears; this is strictly an economic issue, because better known animals at the zoo attract more guests which therefore increases profits.

Eliminating poaching will be difficult, since the most common reason is sustenance hunting. Increasing ecotourism would bring money to the poachers, so they would not have to further exploit the goral population. Captive populations in zoos are healthy, so reintroduction of this species is possible. The goral has been on the endangered species list for some time, but the species' conservation status has not changed. As long as the population continues to decline, the long-tailed goral's outlook is not a healthy one.

== See also ==
- List of mammals of Korea
