= Far Eastern myotis =

Conservation status
- Near Threatened (IUCN 3.1)

Scientific classification
- Kingdom: Animalia
- Phylum: Chordata
- Class: Mammalia
- Order: Chiroptera
- Family: Vespertilionidae
- Genus: Myotis
- Species: M. bombinus

Binomial name
- Myotis bombinus Thomas, 1906
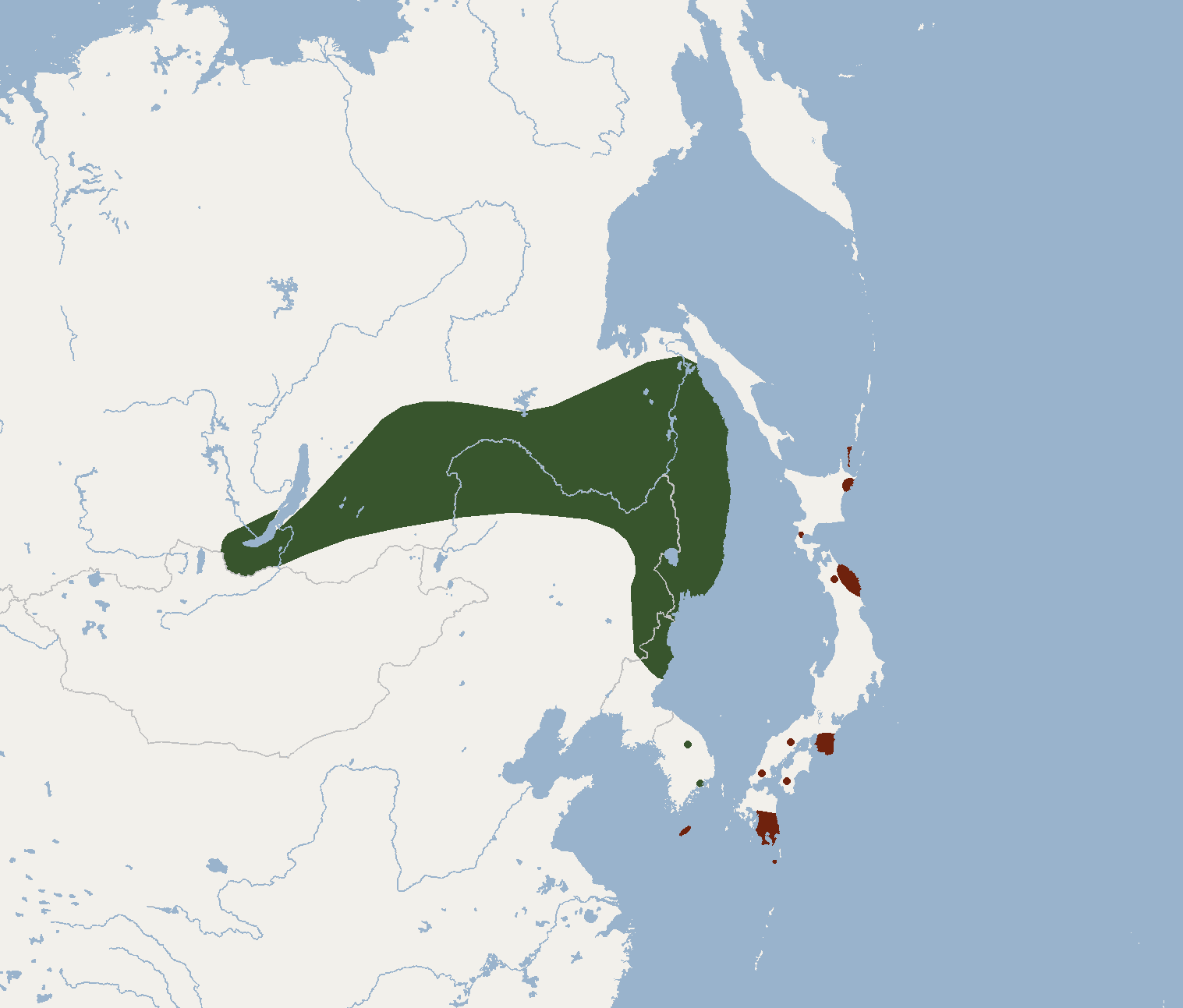

Species of bat

The Far Eastern myotis or bombinus bat (Myotis bombinus) is a species of mouse-eared bat found in East Asia. It is widespread but uncommon across the Korean Peninsula, and spends the winter hibernating in caves.
