= Jeju striped field mouse =

Scientific classification
- Kingdom: Animalia
- Phylum: Chordata
- Class: Mammalia
- Order: Rodentia
- Family: Muridae
- Genus: Apodemus
- Species: A. chejuensis

Binomial name
- Apodemus chejuensis Jones et Johnson, 1965

Species of rodent

- Korean name
- Hangul: 제주 등줄쥐
- Hanja: 濟州 등줄쥐
- RR: Jeju deungjuljwi
- MR: Cheju tŭngchuljwi

The Jeju striped field mouse (Apodemus chejuensis) (Korean: 제주등줄쥐) is a field mouse found only on Jejudo, an island in the northern East China Sea off the southwestern coast of South Korea. It was originally described in 1965 as a subspecies of Apodemus agrarius. However, a 1992 study of mitochondrial DNA found that it was in fact a separate species.

The Jeju striped field mouse is one of the most abundant mammals on Jeju. It has brown fur with an eel back, hence the name.

The species is endemic to South Korea.
