= Milne-Edwards =

Milne-Edwards is a surname. Notable people with the surname include:

- Henri Milne-Edwards (1800–1885), French zoologist
- Alphonse Milne-Edwards (1835–1900), French ornithologist and carcinologist, a son of Henri Milne-Edwards

== Animals ==
- Milne-Edwards's sifaka
- Milne-Edwards' sportive lemur
- Milne-Edwards' Long-clawed Mouse

== See also ==
- Milne (surname)
- Edwards (surname)
