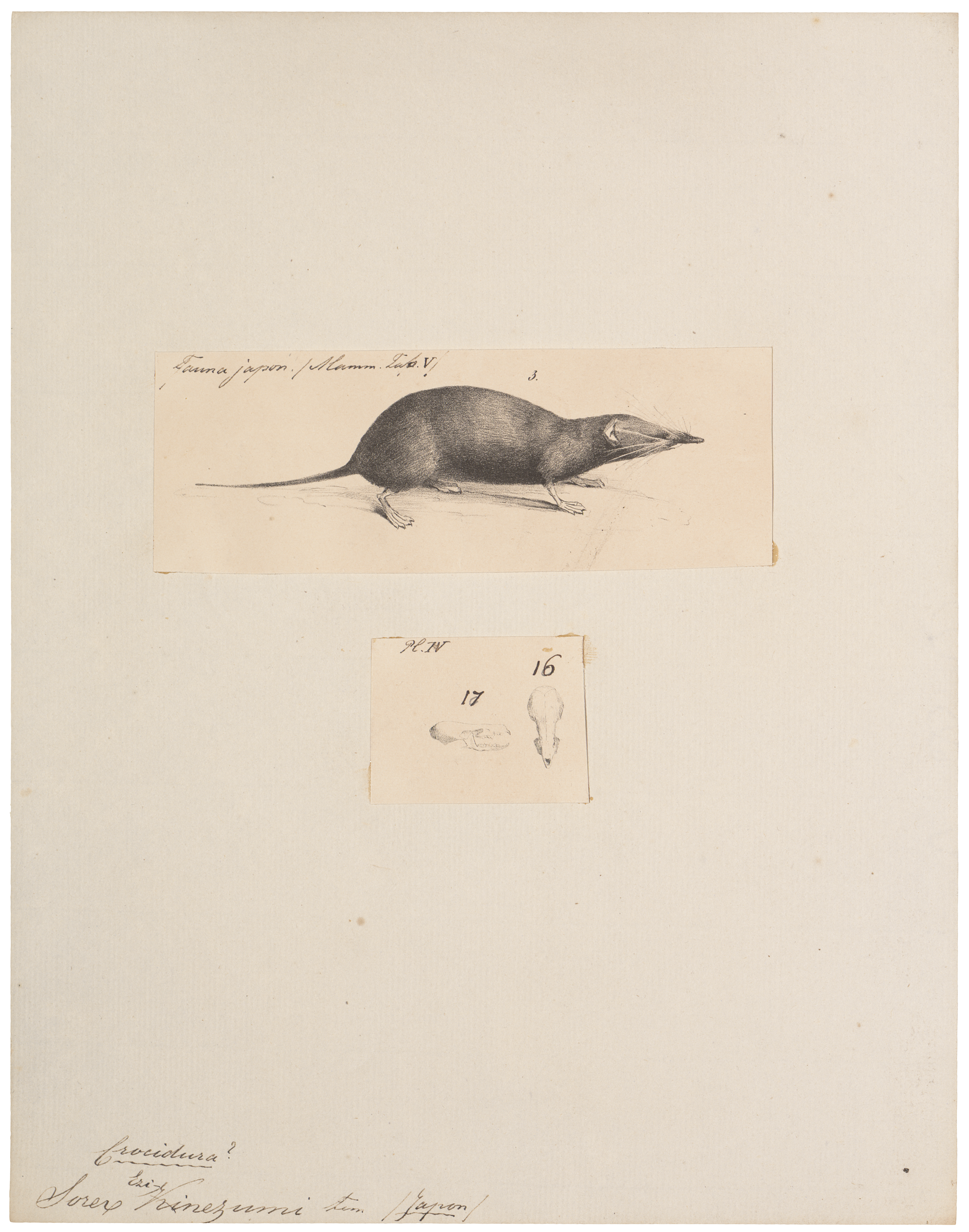

Conservation status
- Least Concern (IUCN 3.1)

Scientific classification
- Kingdom: Animalia
- Phylum: Chordata
- Class: Mammalia
- Order: Eulipotyphla
- Family: Soricidae
- Genus: Crocidura
- Species: C. dsinezumi

Binomial name
- Crocidura dsinezumi (Temminck, 1842)
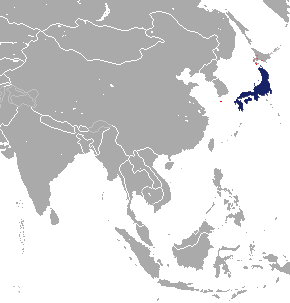
- Dsinezumi shrew range (blue — native, red — introduced)

= Dsinezumi shrew =

Species of mammal

The Dsinezumi shrew (Crocidura dsinezumi), also known as the Japanese white-toothed shrew, is a species of musk shrew found in Japan, Korea's Jeju Island and also in the state of Manipur, India. It is widespread, and considered to be of "least concern" by the IUCN.

There has been a successful effort to breed C. dsinezumi as a laboratory animal.
