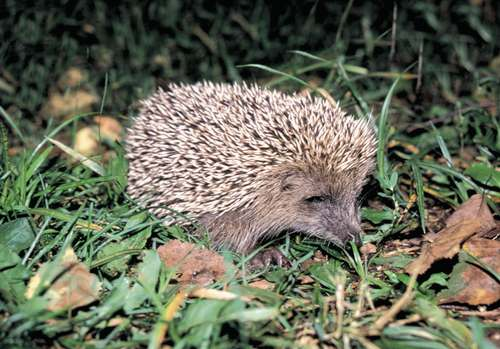
- In Lazo national park, Russia

Conservation status
- Least Concern (IUCN 3.1)

Scientific classification
- Kingdom: Animalia
- Phylum: Chordata
- Class: Mammalia
- Order: Eulipotyphla
- Family: Erinaceidae
- Genus: Erinaceus
- Species: E. amurensis

Binomial name
- Erinaceus amurensis Schrenk, 1858
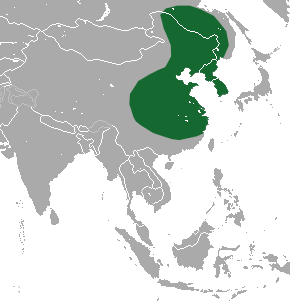
- Amur hedgehog range

Synonyms
- E. chinensis Satunin, 1907; E. dealbatus Swinhoe, 1870; E. hanensis Matschie, 1907; E. koreanus Lönnberg, 1922; E. koreensis Mori, 1922; E. kreyenbergi Matschie, 1907; E. orientalis Allen, 1903; E. tschifuensis Matschie, 1907; E. ussuriensis Satunin, 1907

= Amur hedgehog =

Species of mammal

The Amur hedgehog (Erinaceus amurensis), also called the Manchurian hedgehog, is a hedgehog similar to the European hedgehog in appearance and behaviour, although it is more lightly coloured. It is native to Amur Oblast and Primorye in Russia, Manchuria in China, and the Korean Peninsula. Like other hedgehogs, it uses scent and hearing while looking for prey, and the name "hedgehog" refers to the pig-like grunts it makes as it forages.

== Description ==
This hedgehog is closely related to and slightly larger and lighter in color than the European hedgehog, with a head-and-body length of between 160 and 290 mm (6 and 11 in) and a very short tail. It weighs between 600 and 1,000 g (21 and 35 oz). The head, back and sides are covered with long, sharp spines. These are of two different colours; some are plain white; others have a white or yellowish-brown base and tip, and a central portion that is mid to dark brown, giving the animal an altogether pale, brownish-grey colour. The quills on the head are separated from each other by narrow strips of bare skin. The quills, covered in keratin, are strong so that they don't break or fall out. These spines are used as a defense mechanism when they are threatened. The hedgehog curls up into a ball, where their quills are facing out and their face/head are curled inwards. The face and underparts are covered in pale hair.

== Distribution and habitat ==
The Amur hedgehog is found natively in the Amur Oblast and Primorye in Russia, Manchuria in China, and the Korean Peninsula. Its range extends from about 29°N, which is just south of the Yangtze River northwards to the Amur Basin and the Korean Peninsula. It occupies a wide range of habitats including grassland, forest edges, and areas with mixed coniferous and broadleaf woodland. The IUCN Red List states that it is found in valleys and lowlands but not in highland regions or cultivated fields. The Mammals of China disagrees, stating that suitable habitats include montane and sub-alpine terrain, steppe, shrublands, cultivated land, villages and city parks. It was introduced to Kanagawa and Shizuoka Prefectures in Japan.

== Reproduction ==
The Amur hedgehog is an animal that can survive on its own without any partnership. These animals typically only come together when it is mating season. There is no information regarding this specific species reproduction to this date.

== Ecology ==
Like other hedgehogs, this is a nocturnal species, emerging at night to forage for small arthropods, especially fly larvae, and earthworms, centipedes, snails, mice, frogs and occasionally fruit. Chinese sources state that this hedgehog is preyed on by sable (Martes zibellina), but Russian sources dispute this. There are one or two litters in the summer, each consisting of four to six young, and in about October, the hedgehog enters a state of torpor and hibernates until spring.

== Status ==
E. amurensis is a common species and no specific threats have been identified, so the International Union for Conservation of Nature has assessed its conservation status as being of "least concern". These hedgehogs, though common, have a lifespan of 8 years, while in captivity. It is unknown how long they live in native lands.
