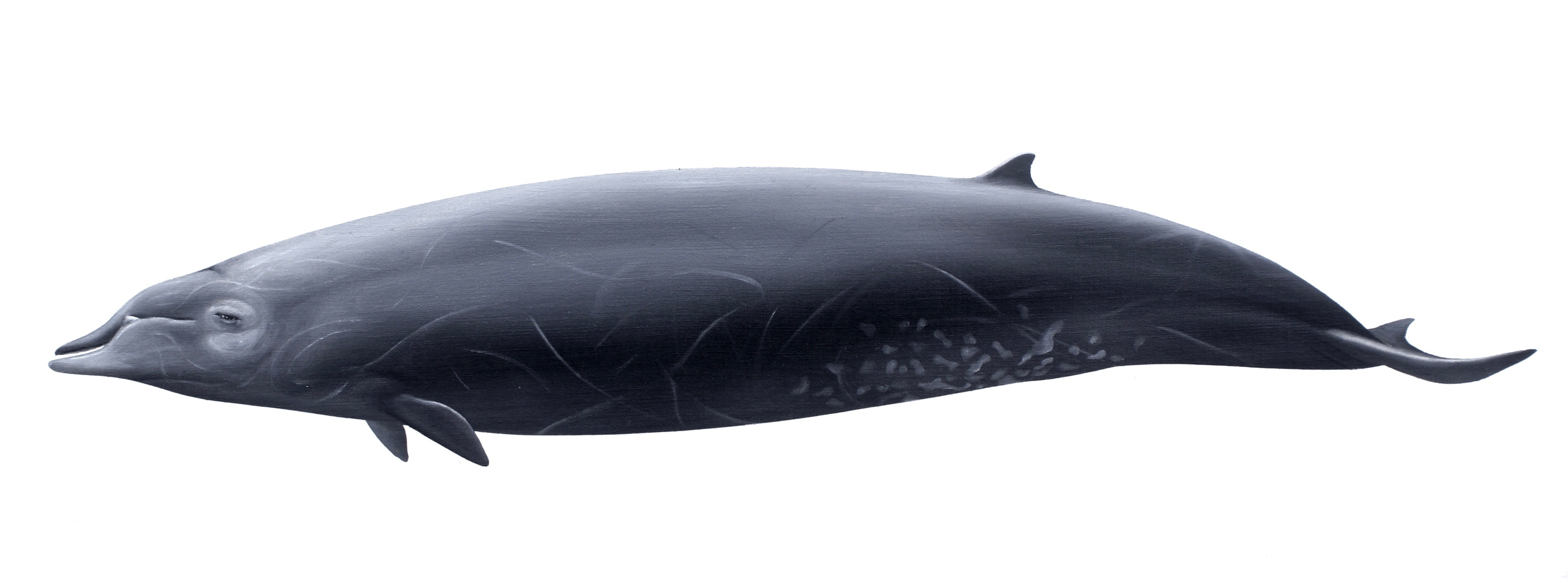
- Painting of male
- Size compared to an average human

Conservation status
- Data Deficient (IUCN 3.1)
- CITES Appendix II

Scientific classification
- Kingdom: Animalia
- Phylum: Chordata
- Class: Mammalia
- Order: Artiodactyla
- Infraorder: Cetacea
- Family: Ziphiidae
- Genus: Mesoplodon
- Species: M. ginkgodens

Binomial name
- Mesoplodon ginkgodens Nishiwaki and Kamiya, 1958
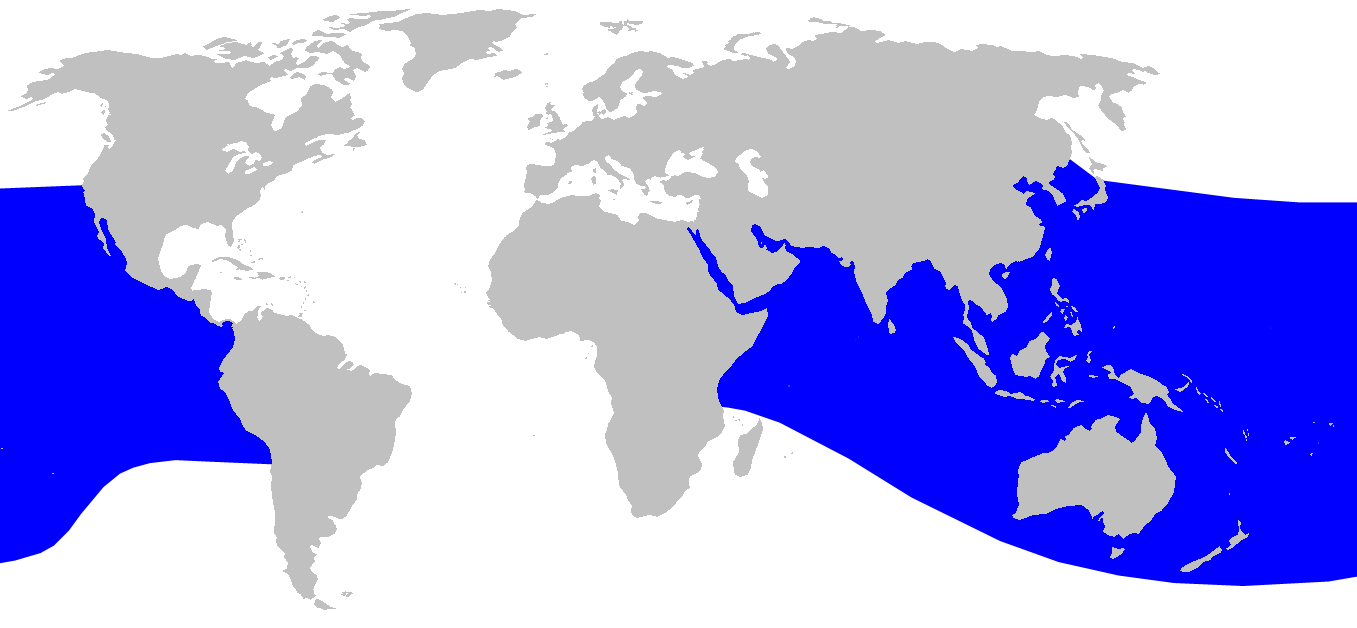
- Ginkgo-toothed beaked whale range

= Ginkgo-toothed beaked whale =

Species of mammal

The ginkgo-toothed beaked whale (Mesoplodon ginkgodens) is a poorly known species of beaked whale named for the unusual shape of its dual teeth. It is a fairly typical-looking species, but is notable for males not having any scarring.

== Description ==
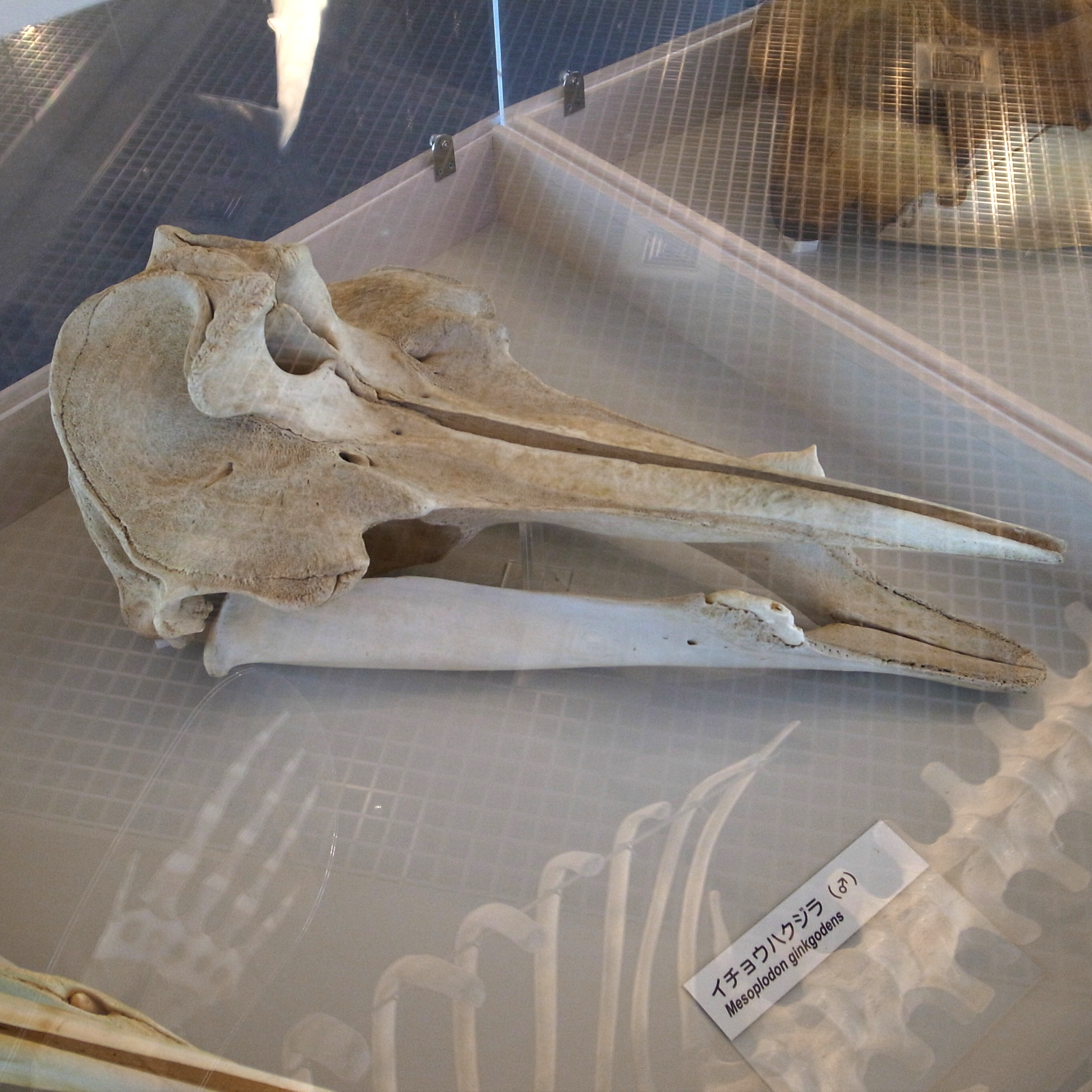
A ginkgo-toothed beaked whale skull located at the Okinawa Churaumi Aquarium, Japan.

Ginkgo-toothed beaked whales are more robust than most mesoplodonts, but otherwise look fairly typical. Halfway through the jaw, there is a sharp curve up where the ginkgo leaf-shaped tooth is.

Unlike other species such as Blainville's beaked whale and Andrews' beaked whale, the teeth do not arch over the rostrum. The beak itself is of a moderate length.

The coloration is overall dark gray on males with light patches on the front half of the beak and around the head, and small white spots on the bottom of the tail, but the location may be variable. Females are a lighter gray and have countershading.

Both sexes reach 5.3 metres (17 feet) in length. They are around 2–2.5 metres (6.6–8.2 feet) long when born.

== Population and distribution ==
This beaked whale has had fewer than 20 strandings off the coasts of Japan, Taiwan, California, the Galapagos Islands, New South Wales, New Zealand, Sri Lanka, the Maldives and the Strait of Malacca. Its range is essentially tropical and temperate waters in the Indian and Pacific Ocean. There are currently no population estimates.

A potential sighting occurred in the South China Sea in May 2019, although it was possible the sighted whales were Deraniyagala's beaked whales. In February 2021, a pod of three whales was sighted at the Parengarenga Canyons, off North Cape, New Zealand.

In June 2024, scientists aboard Pacific Storm, a research vessel, detected a pair of juvenile beaked whales off the coast of Baja California. A skin sample taken from the pair later confirmed this as the first known at-sea sighting of this species of beaked whale.

In late 2024, conservationists aboard MS Ambience, a cruise ship operated by Ambassador Cruise Line, encountered a breaching adult beaked whale in the Tasman Sea.

== Behavior ==
Unlike all other known members of Ziphiidae, there is no evidence that the males engage in combat, although this may be due to a limited sample size. The species probably feeds primarily on squid. The whales are shy, wary of boats, and spend almost all of their time foraging in the deep, coming up for air for a few minutes before descending again.

The whales' call has a distinct acoustic signature, known as BW43.

== Conservation ==
Until 2024, the only known observations of this species while alive came from hunters off the coasts of Japan and Taiwan, who occasionally take an individual. They are also affected by drift gillnets. One individual, identified from a DNA sample, was known to have interacted with a pelagic longline fishery in the central and western Pacific Ocean. The ginkgo-toothed beaked whale is covered by the Memorandum of Understanding for the Conservation of Cetaceans and Their Habitats in the Pacific Islands Region (Pacific Cetaceans MOU).

The whales are particularly sensitive to sonar which disrupts their foraging and can cause them to ascend too quickly resulting in a form of decompression sickness.

== Specimens ==
- In June 2024, 2 specimens were found in Baja California by tracking the previously unidentified whale song BW43.
- In late 2024, 1 specimen was found in the Tasman Sea by conservationists aboard the ship MS Ambience.

== See also ==
- List of cetaceans
