= List of mammals of North Korea =

This is a list of the mammal species recorded in North Korea. There are 105 mammal species in North Korea, of which none are critically endangered, seven are endangered, six are vulnerable, and three are near threatened. One of the species listed for North Korea is considered to be extinct.

The following tags are used to highlight each species' conservation status as assessed by the International Union for Conservation of Nature:

EX	Extinct	No reasonable doubt that the last individual has died.
EW	Extinct in the wild	Known only to survive in captivity or as a naturalized populations well outside its previous range.
CR	Critically endangered	The species is in imminent risk of extinction in the wild.
EN	Endangered	The species is facing an extremely high risk of extinction in the wild.
VU	Vulnerable	The species is facing a high risk of extinction in the wild.
NT	Near threatened	The species does not meet any of the criteria that would categorise it as risking extinction but it is likely to do so in the future.
LC	Least concern	There are no current identifiable risks to the species.
DD	Data deficient	There is inadequate information to make an assessment of the risks to this species.

Some species were assessed using an earlier set of criteria. Species assessed using this system have the following instead of near threatened and least concern categories:

LR/cd	Lower risk/conservation dependent	Species which were the focus of conservation programmes and may have moved into a higher risk category if that programme was discontinued.
LR/nt	Lower risk/near threatened	Species which are close to being classified as vulnerable but are not the subject of conservation programmes.
LR/lc	Lower risk/least concern	Species for which there are no identifiable risks.

== Order: Rodentia (rodents) ==
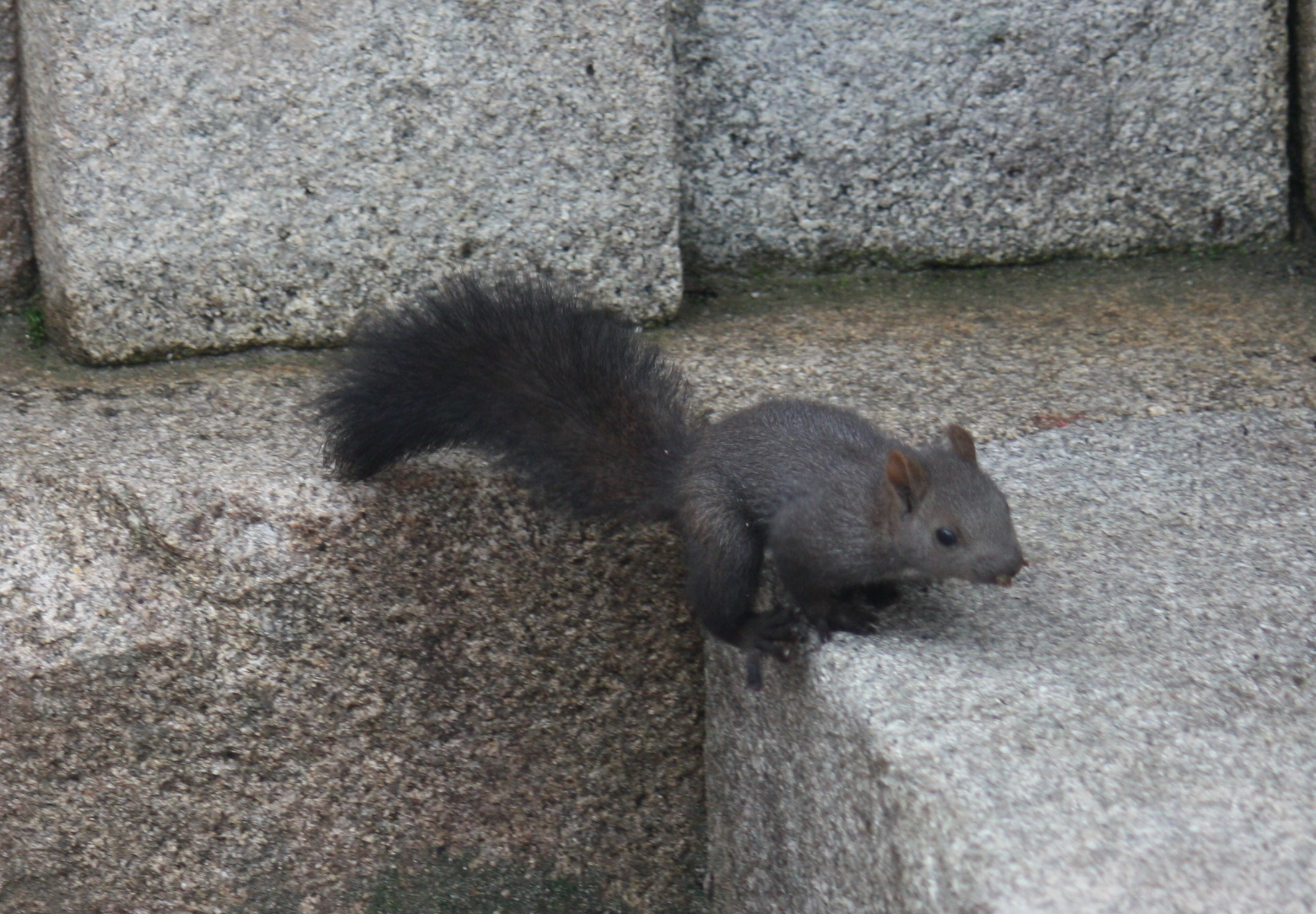
Red squirrel

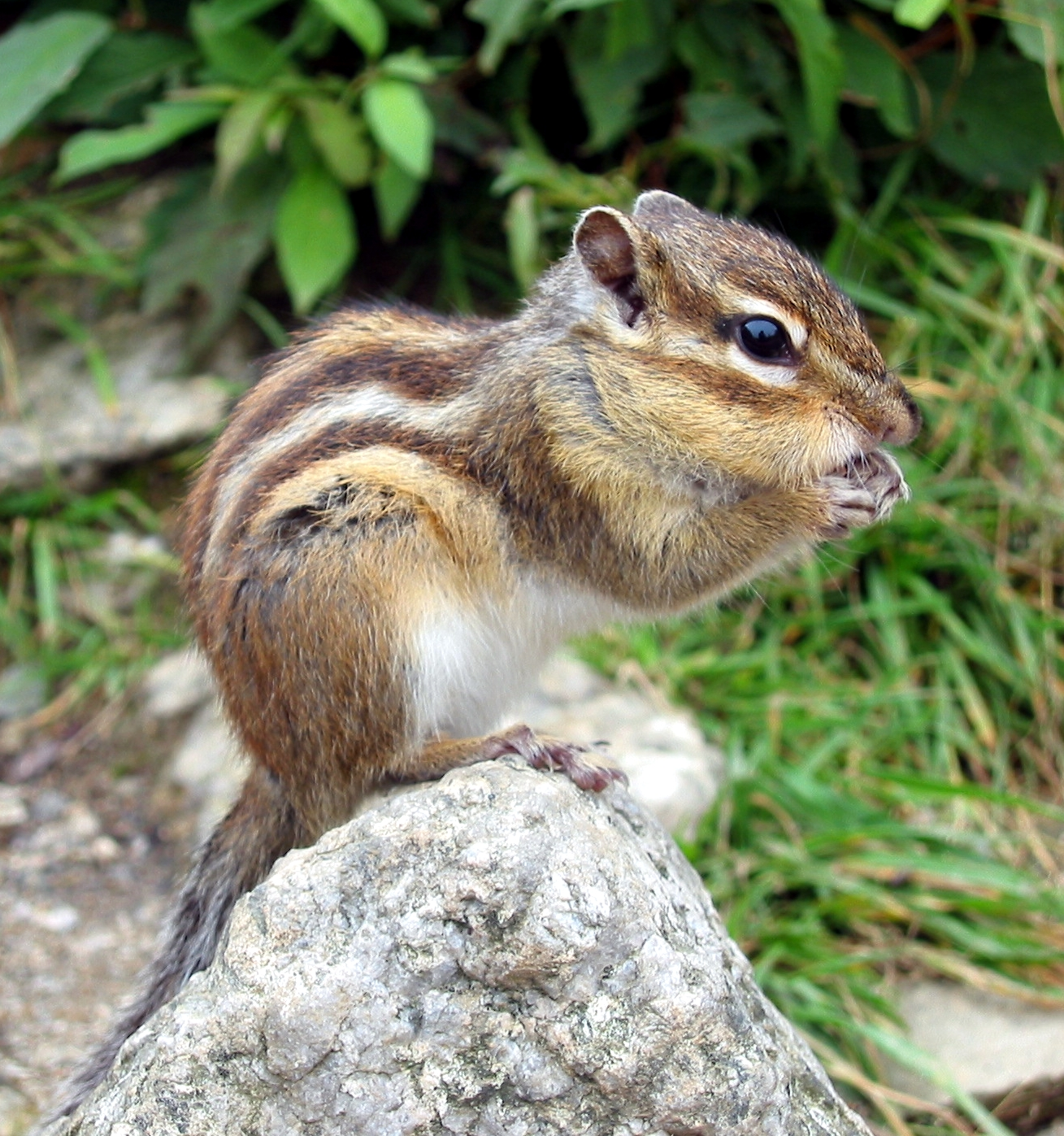
Siberian chipmunk

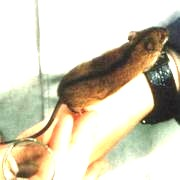
Striped field mouse

Rodents make up the largest order of mammals, with over 40% of mammalian species. They have two incisors in the upper and lower jaw which grow continually and must be kept short by gnawing. Most rodents are small though the capybara can weigh up to 45 kg (99 lb).

- Suborder: Sciurognathi
  - Family: Sciuridae (squirrels)
    - Subfamily: Sciurinae
      - Tribe: Sciurini
        - Genus: Sciurus
          - Red squirrel, Sciurus vulgaris NT
      - Tribe: Pteromyini
        - Genus: Pteromys
          - Siberian flying squirrel, Pteromys volans LR/nt
    - Subfamily: Xerinae
      - Tribe: Marmotini
        - Genus: Eutamias
          - Siberian chipmunk, Eutamias sibiricus LR/lc
  - Family: Cricetidae
    - Subfamily: Cricetinae
      - Genus: Cricetulus
        - Chinese striped hamster, Cricetulus barabensis LR/lc
      - Genus: Tscherskia
        - Greater long-tailed hamster, Tscherskia triton LR/lc
    - Subfamily: Arvicolinae
      - Genus: Clethrionomys
        - Grey red-backed vole, Clethrionomys rufocanus LR/lc
        - Northern red-backed vole, Clethrionomys rutilus LR/lc
      - Genus: Eothenomys
        - Royal vole, Eothenomys regulus LR/lc
  - Family: Muridae (mice, rats, voles, gerbils, hamsters, etc.)
    - Subfamily: Murinae
      - Genus: Apodemus
        - Striped field mouse, Apodemus agrarius LR/lc
        - Korean field mouse, Apodemus peninsulae LR/lc
      - Genus: Micromys
        - Harvest mouse, Micromys minutus LR/nt
      - Genus: Rattus
        - Tanezumi rat, Rattus tanezumi LR/lc

== Order: Lagomorpha (lagomorphs) ==
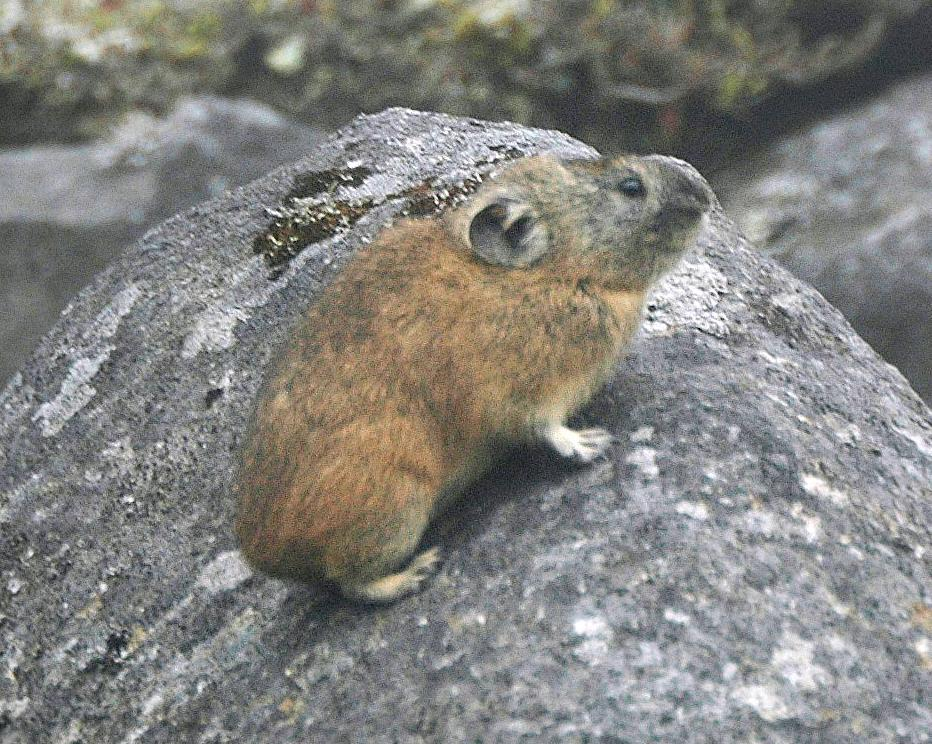
Northern pika

The lagomorphs comprise two families, Leporidae (hares and rabbits), and Ochotonidae (pikas). Though they can resemble rodents, and were classified as a superfamily in that order until the early 20th century, they have since been considered a separate order. They differ from rodents in a number of physical characteristics, such as having four incisors in the upper jaw rather than two.

- Family: Leporidae (rabbits, hares)
  - Genus: Lepus
    - Korean hare, L. coreanus LC
    - Manchurian hare, L. mandshuricus LC presence uncertain
- Family: Ochotonidae (pikas)
  - Genus: Ochotona
    - Northern pika, Ochotona hyperborea LC

== Order: Erinaceomorpha (hedgehogs and gymnures) ==
The order Erinaceomorpha contains a single family, Erinaceidae, which comprise the hedgehogs and gymnures. The hedgehogs are easily recognised by their spines while gymnures look more like large rats.

- Family: Erinaceidae (hedgehogs)
  - Subfamily: Erinaceinae
    - Genus: Erinaceus
      - Amur hedgehog, Erinaceus amurensis LR/lc

== Order: Soricomorpha (shrews, moles, and solenodons) ==
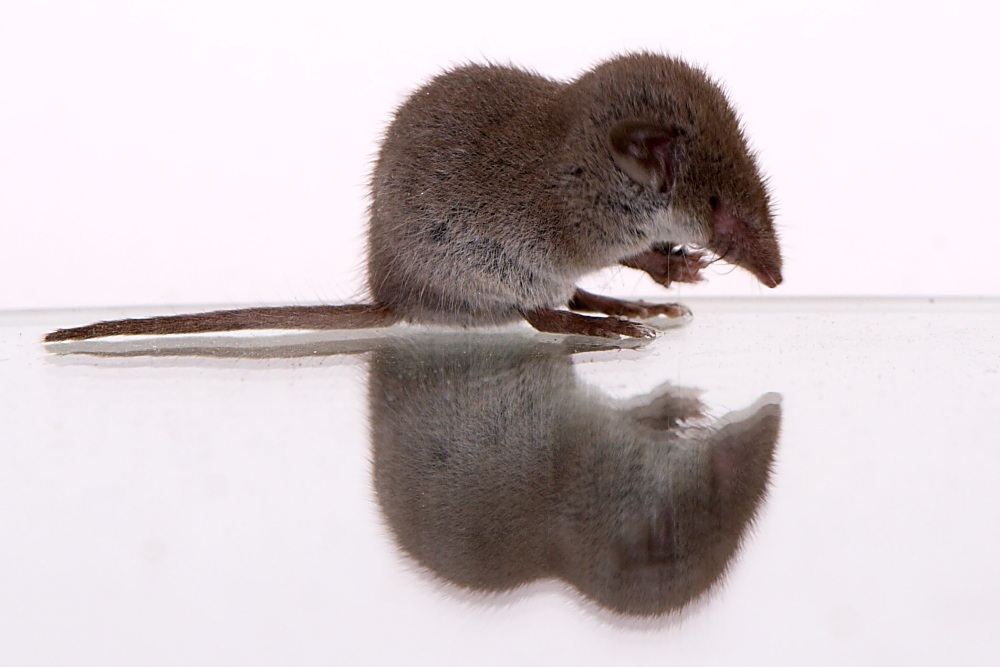
Lesser white-toothed shrew

The "shrew-forms" are insectivorous mammals. The shrews and solenodons closely resemble mice while the moles are stout-bodied burrowers.

- Family: Soricidae (shrews)
  - Subfamily: Crocidurinae
    - Genus: Crocidura
      - Ussuri white-toothed shrew, Crocidura lasiura LR/lc
      - Lesser white-toothed shrew, Crocidura suaveolens LR/lc
  - Subfamily: Soricinae
    - Tribe: Nectogalini
      - Genus: Neomys
        - Eurasian water shrew, Neomys fodiens LR/lc
    - Tribe: Soricini
      - Genus: Sorex
        - Laxmann's shrew, Sorex caecutiens LR/lc
        - Slender shrew, Sorex gracillimus LR/lc
        - Taiga shrew, Sorex isodon LR/lc
        - Ussuri shrew, Sorex mirabilis LR/lc
- Family: Talpidae (moles)
  - Subfamily: Talpinae
    - Tribe: Talpini
      - Genus: Mogera
        - Large mole, Mogera robusta LR/lc

== Order: Chiroptera (bats) ==
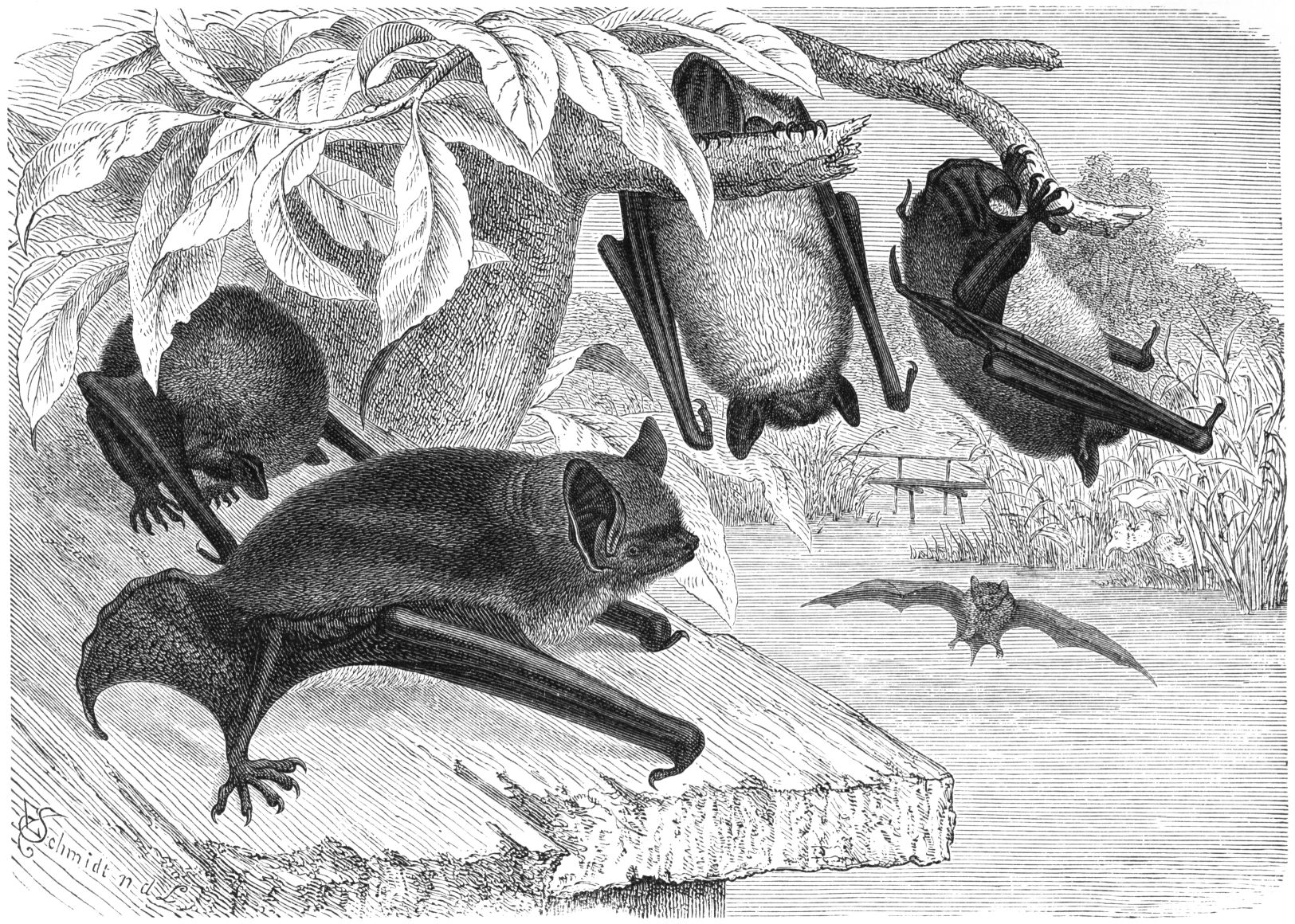
Daubenton's bat

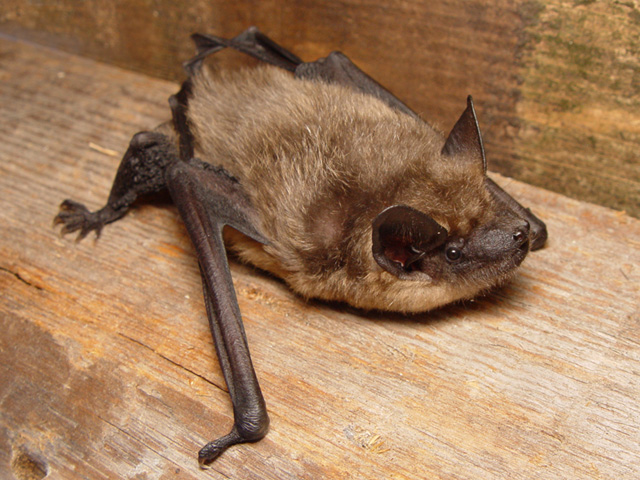
Serotine bat

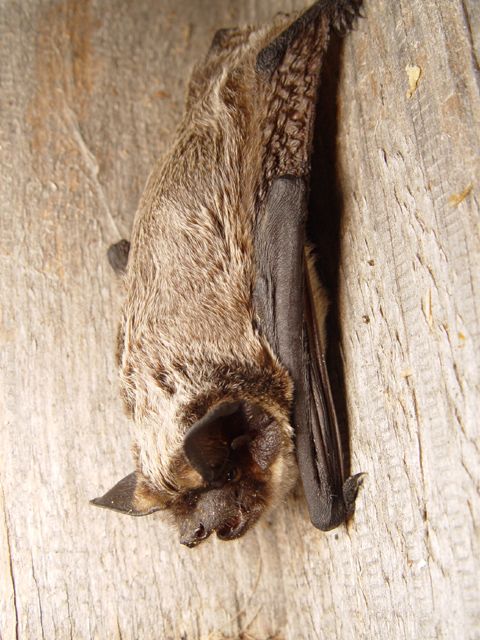
Particoloured bat

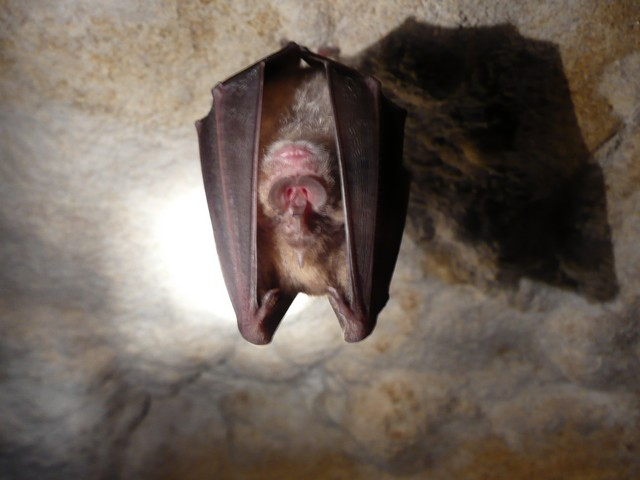
Greater horseshoe bat

The bats' most distinguishing feature is that their forelimbs are developed as wings, making them the only mammals capable of flight. Bat species account for about 20% of all mammals.

- Family: Vespertilionidae
  - Subfamily: Myotinae
    - Genus: Myotis
      - Far Eastern myotis, Myotis bombinus LR/nt
      - Daubenton's bat, Myotis daubentonii LR/lc
      - Hodgson's bat, Myotis formosus LR/lc
      - Fraternal myotis, Myotis frater LR/nt
      - Ikonnikov's bat, Myotis ikonnikovi LR/lc
      - Whiskered bat, Myotis mystacinus LR/lc
      - Natterer's bat, Myotis nattereri LR/lc
  - Subfamily: Vespertilioninae
    - Genus: Eptesicus
      - Kobayashi's bat, Eptesicus kobayashii DD
      - Northern bat, Eptesicus nilssoni LR/lc
      - Serotine bat, Eptesicus serotinus LR/lc
    - Genus: Hypsugo
      - Savi's pipistrelle, Hypsugo savii LR/lc
    - Genus: Nyctalus
      - Birdlike noctule, Nyctalus aviator LR/nt
    - Genus: Plecotus
      - Long-eared bat, Plecotus sp. (erroneously reported as P. auritus)
    - Genus: Vespertilio
      - Parti-coloured bat, Vespertilio murinus LR/lc
      - Asian parti-colored bat, Vespertilio superans LR/lc
  - Subfamily: Murininae
    - Genus: Murina
      - Little tube-nosed bat, Murina aurata LR/nt
        - Greater tube-nosed bat, Murina leucogaster LR/lc
        - Ussuri tube-nosed bat, Murina ussuriensis EN
  - Subfamily: Miniopterinae
    - Genus: Miniopterus
      - Schreibers' long-fingered bat, Miniopterus schreibersii LC
- Family: Molossidae
  - Genus: Tadarida
    - European free-tailed bat, Tadarida teniotis LR/lc
- Family: Rhinolophidae
  - Subfamily: Rhinolophinae
    - Genus: Rhinolophus
      - Greater horseshoe bat, Rhinolophus ferrumequinum LR/nt

== Order: Cetacea (whales, dolphins, porpoises) ==
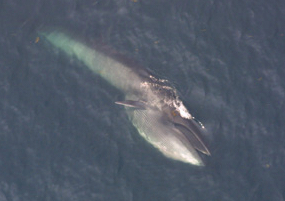
Sei whale

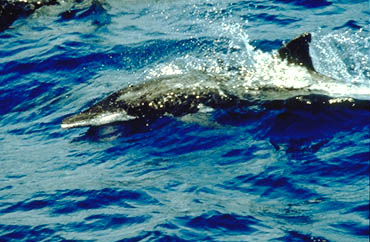
Rough-toothed dolphin

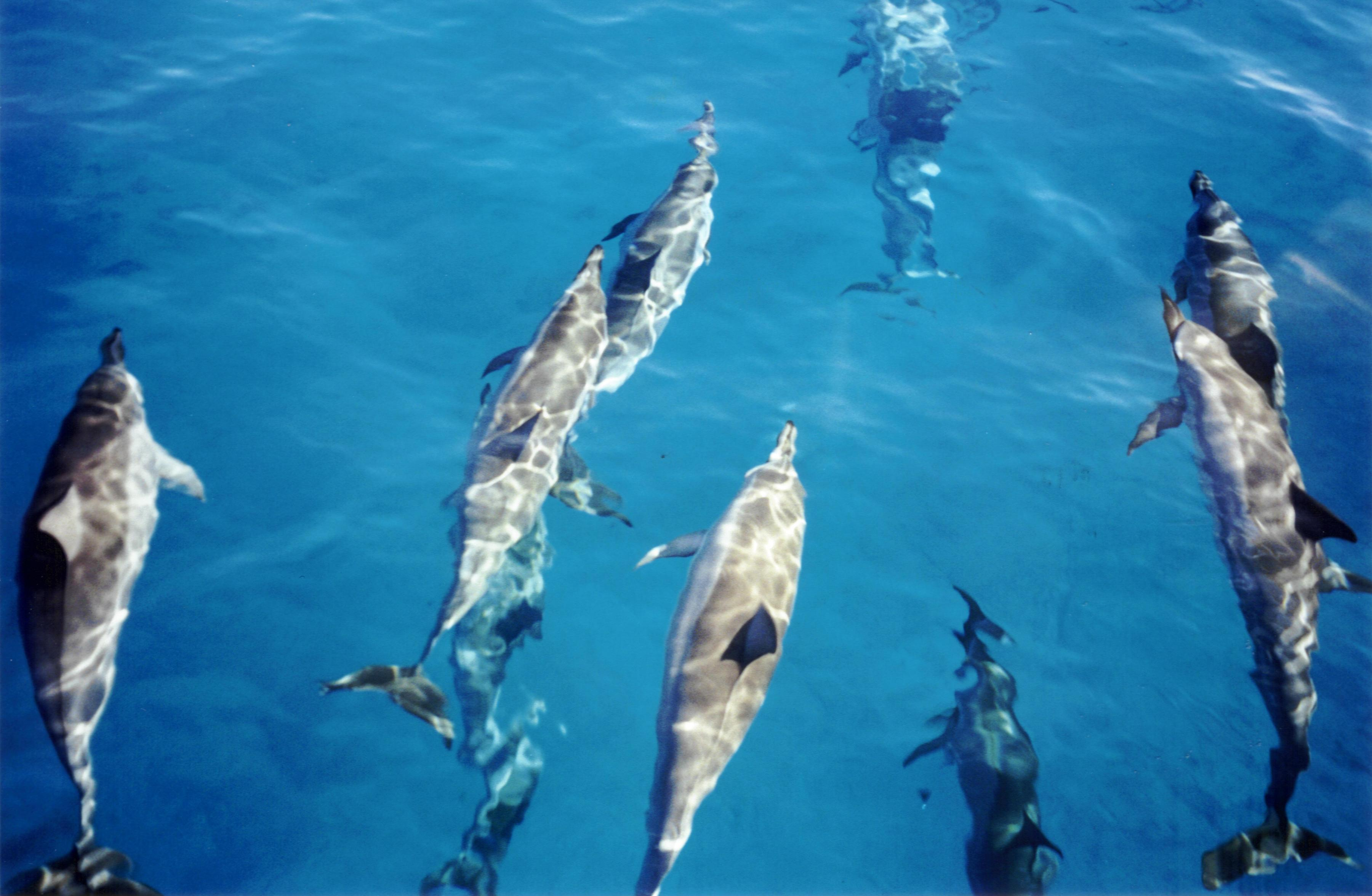
Spinner dolphins

The order Cetacea includes whales, dolphins and porpoises. They are the mammals most fully adapted to aquatic life with a spindle-shaped nearly hairless body, protected by a thick layer of blubber, and forelimbs and tail modified to provide propulsion underwater.

- Suborder: Mysticeti (baleen whales)
  - Family: Balaenidae (right and bowhead whales)
    - Genus: Balaena
      - Bowhead whale, Balaena mysticetus (Sea of Okhotsk) EN
    - Genus: Eubalaena
      - North Pacific right whale, Eubalaena japonica CR
  - Family: Eschrichtiidae (gray whale)
    - Genus: Eschrichtius
      - Western gray whale, Eschrichtius robustus CR
  - Family: Balaenopteridae (rorquals)
    - Subfamily: Megapterinae
      - Genus: Megaptera
        - Humpback whale, Megaptera novaeangliae (Sea of Japan and Yellow/Bohai Seas) EN
    - Subfamily: Balaenopterinae
      - Genus: Balaenoptera
        - Common minke whale, Balaenoptera acutorostrata ( Sea of Japan and Yellow/Bohai Sea)EN
        - Northern sei whale, Balaenoptera borealis EN
        - Northern fin whale, Balaenoptera physalus physalus (Coastal Asia) CR
        - Northern blue whale, Balaenoptera musculus musculus (Coastal Asia) CR
- Suborder: Odontoceti (toothed whales)
  - Superfamily: Platanistoidea
    - Family: Phocoenidae
      - Genus: Neophocaena
        - Sunameri, Neophocaena phocaenoides phocaenoides VU
      - Genus: Phocoena
        - Harbour porpoise, Phocoena phocoena VU
      - Genus: Phocoenoides
        - Dall's porpoise, Phocoenoides dalli LR/cd
    - Family: Physeteridae
      - Genus: Physeter
        - Sperm whale, Physeter macrocephalus VU
    - Family: Kogiidae
      - Genus: Kogia
        - Pygmy sperm whale, Kogia breviceps LR/lc
        - Dwarf sperm whale, Kogia sima LR/lc
    - Family: Ziphidae (beaked whales)
      - Genus: Berardius
        - Baird's beaked whale, Berardius bairdii LR/cd
      - Genus: Mesoplodon
        - Blainville's beaked whale, Mesoplodon densirostris DD
        - Ginkgo-toothed beaked whale, Mesoplodon ginkgodens DD
        - Stejneger's beaked whale, Mesoplodon stejnegeri DD
      - Genus: Ziphius
        - Cuvier's beaked whale, Ziphius cavirostris DD
    - Family: Delphinidae (marine dolphins)
      - Genus: Steno
        - Rough-toothed dolphin, Steno bredanensis DD
      - Genus: Stenella
        - Pantropical spotted dolphin, Stenella attenuata LR/cd
        - Striped dolphin, Stenella coeruleoalba LR/cd
        - Spinner dolphin, Stenella longirostris LR/cd
      - Genus: Delphinus
        - Long-beaked common dolphin, Delphinus capensis LR/lc
        - Short-beaked common dolphin, Delphinus delphis LR/lc
      - Genus: Tursiops
        - Common bottlenose dolphin, Tursiops truncatus LR/lc
      - Genus: Lissodelphis
        - Northern right whale dolphin, Lissodelphis borealis LR/lc
      - Genus: Sagmatias
        - Pacific white-sided dolphin, Sagmatias obliquidens LR/lc
      - Genus: Orcinus
        - Orca, Orcinus orca (Sea of Japan and Yellow/Bohai Seas) EN
      - Genus: Pseudorca
        - False killer whale, Pseudorca crassidens DD
      - Genus: Feresa
        - Pygmy killer whale, Feresa attenuata DD
      - Genus: Globicephala
        - Short-finned pilot whale, Globicephala macrorhyncus DD
      - Genus: Grampus
        - Risso's dolphin, Grampus griseus DD

== Order: Carnivora (carnivorans) ==
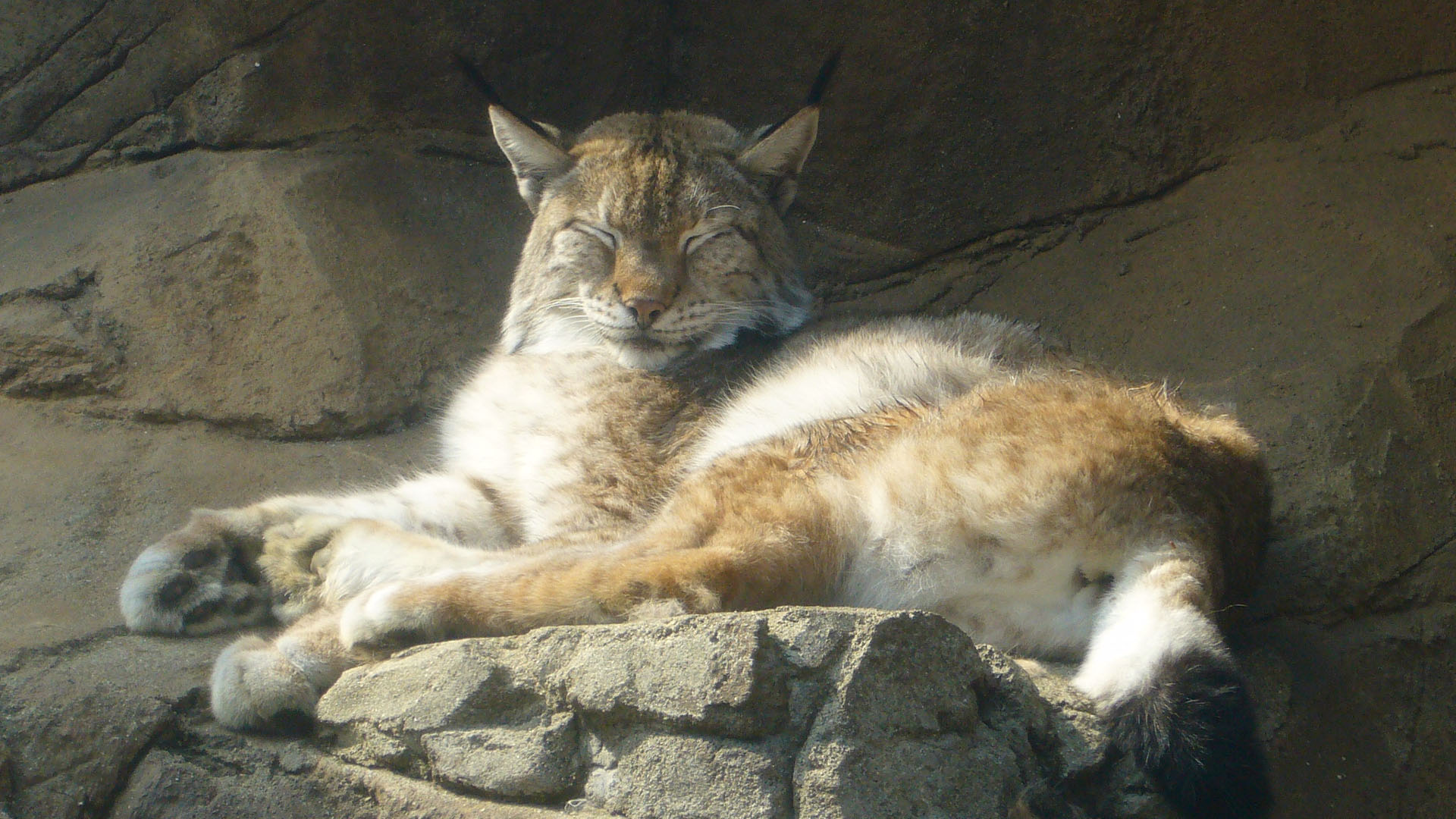
Eurasian lynx

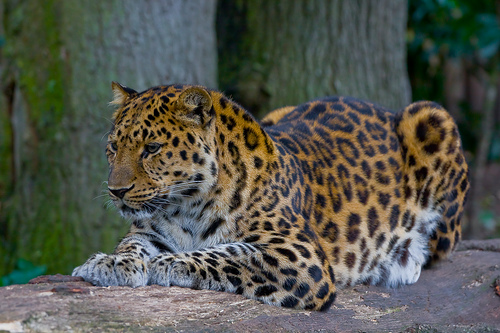
Amur leopard

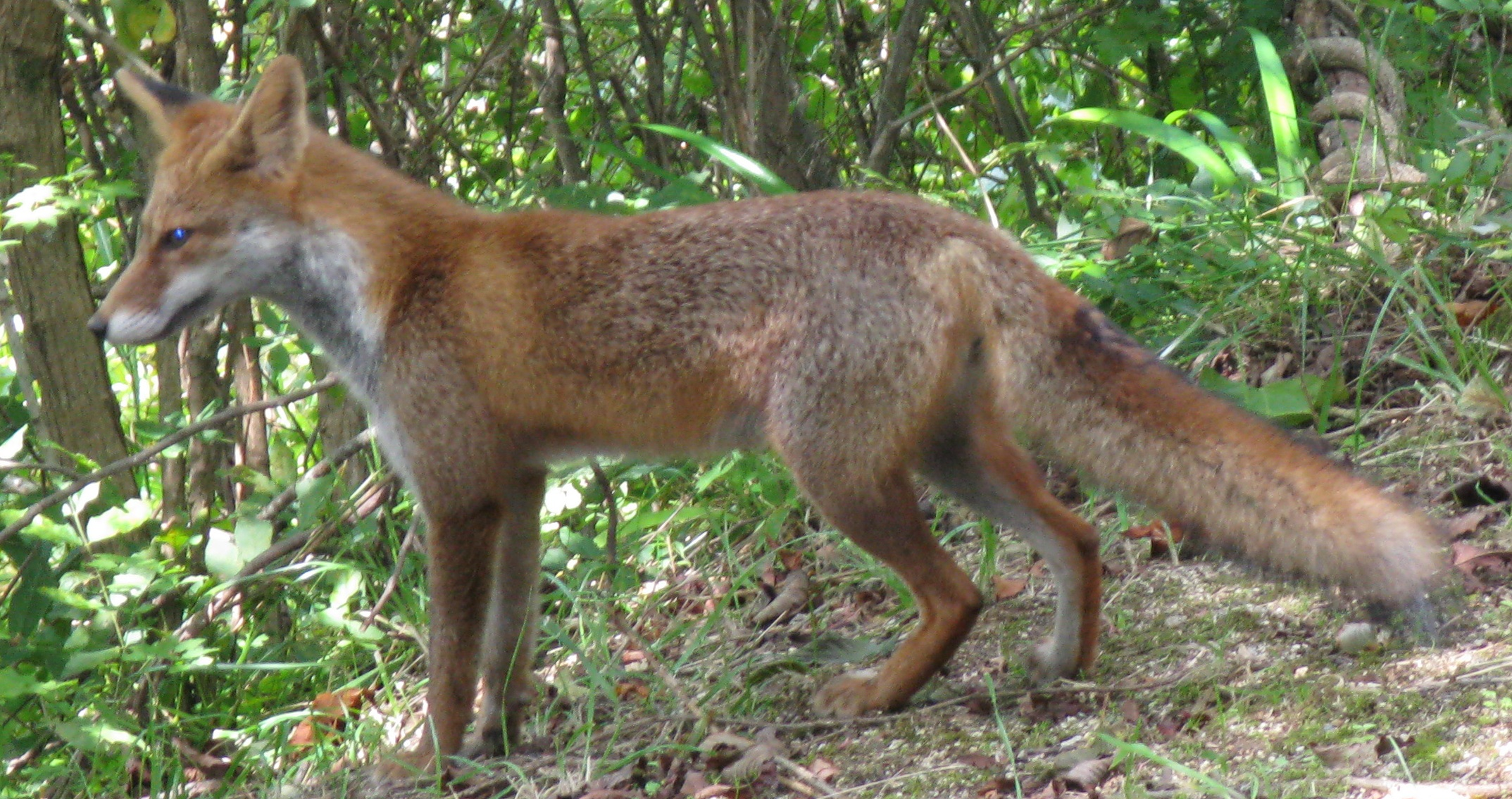
Red fox

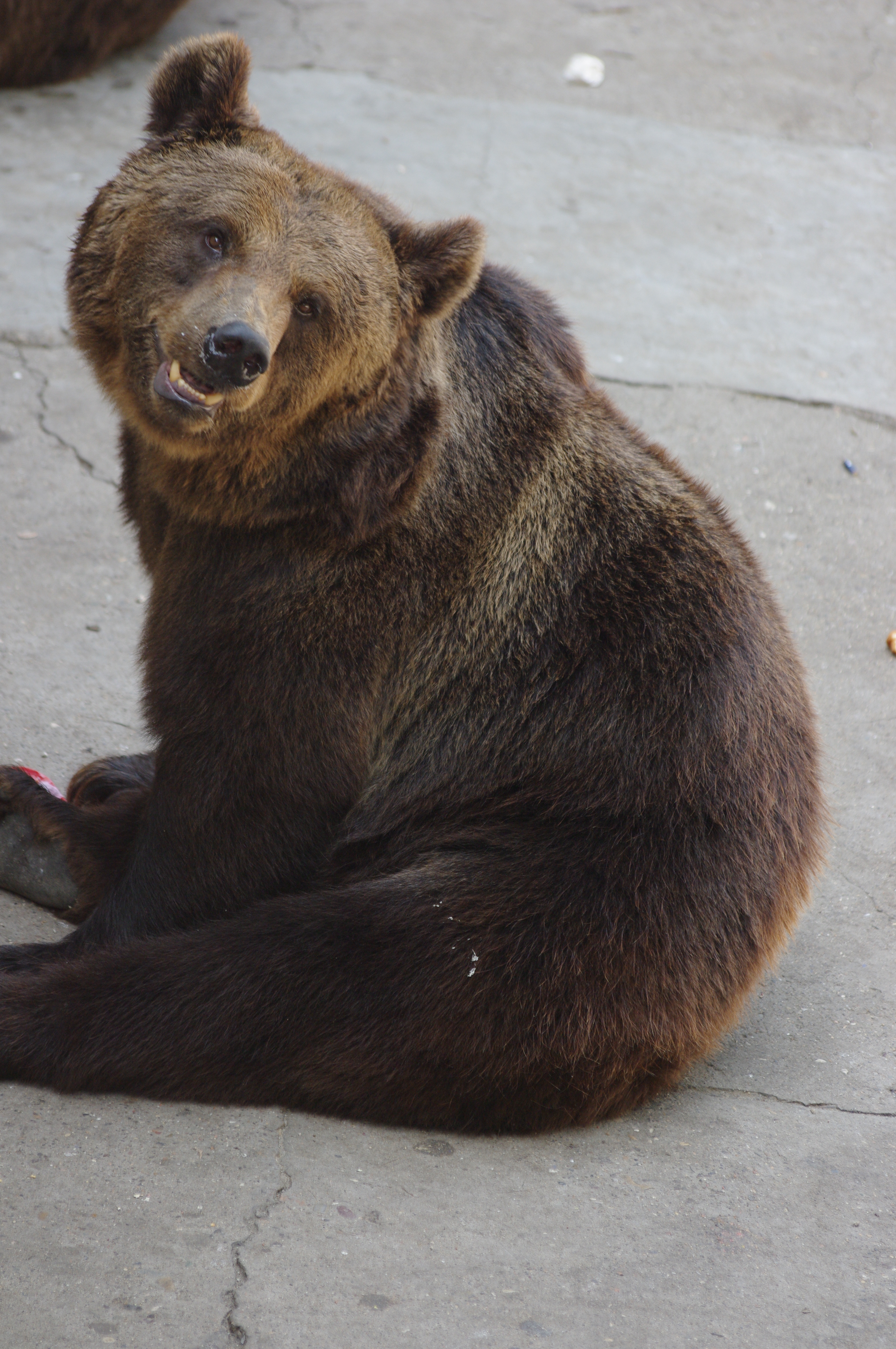
Ussuri brown bear

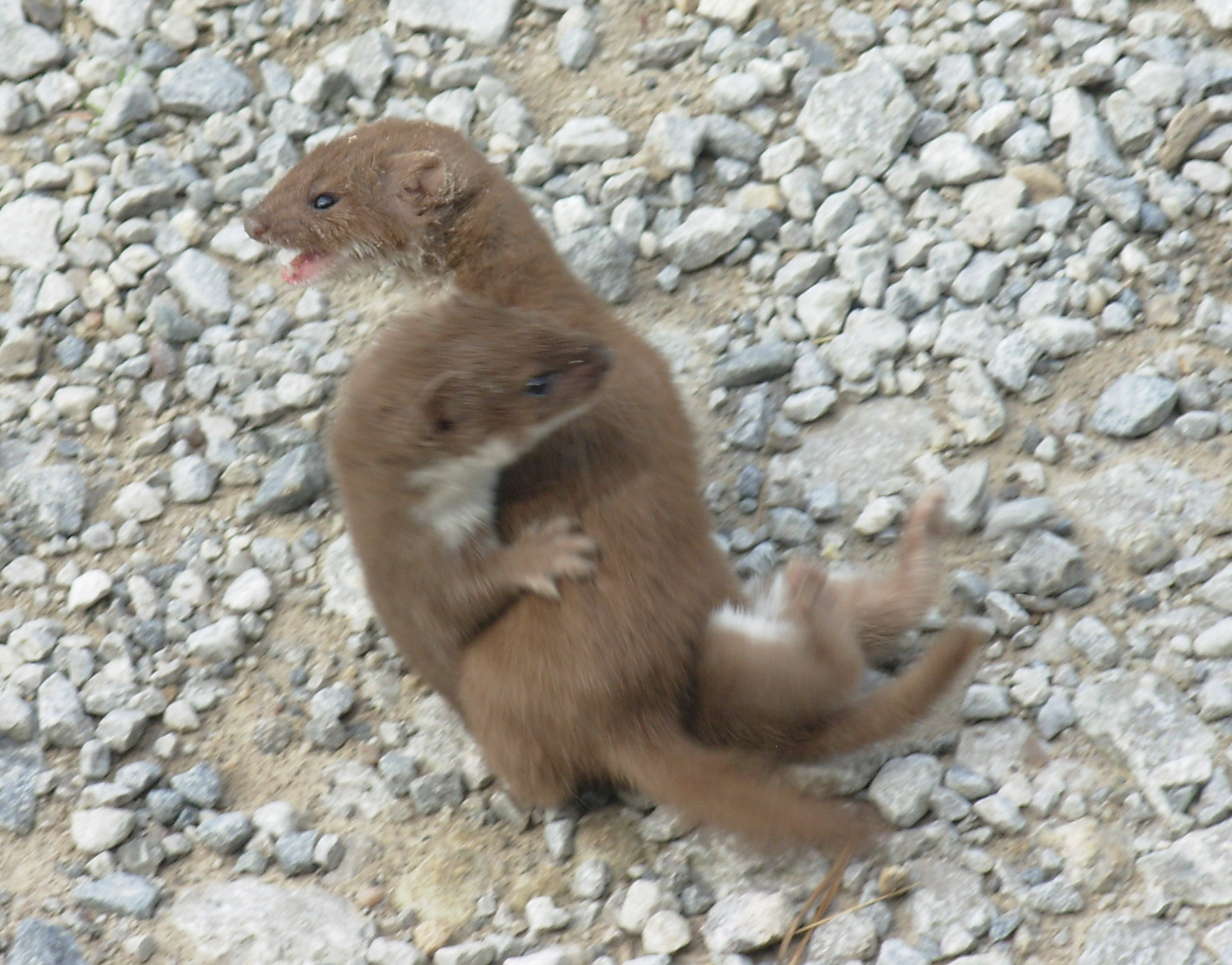
Least weasel

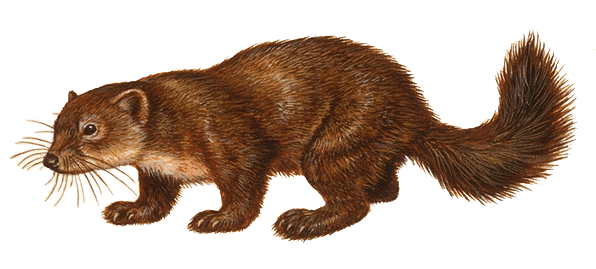
Sable

There are over 260 species of carnivorans, the majority of which feed primarily on meat. They have a characteristic skull shape and dentition.

- Suborder: Feliformia
  - Family: Felidae (cats)
    - Subfamily: Felinae
      - Genus: Lynx
        - Eurasian lynx, L. lynx LC
      - Genus: Prionailurus
        - Leopard cat, P. bengalensis LC
    - Subfamily: Pantherinae
      - Genus: Panthera
        - Leopard, P. pardus VU possibly extirpated
          - Amur leopard, P. p. orientalis CR possibly extirpated
        - Tiger, P. tigris EN possibly extirpated
          - Siberian tiger, P. t. tigris EN possibly extirpated
- Suborder: Caniformia
  - Family: Canidae (dogs, foxes)
    - Genus: Canis
      - Gray wolf, C.lupus LC
        - Mongolian wolf, C. l. chanco
    - Genus: Cuon
      - Dhole, C. alpinus EN presence uncertain
    - Genus: Nyctereutes
      - Raccoon dog, N. procyonoides LC
    - Genus: Vulpes
      - Red fox, V. vulpes
        - Korean fox, V. v. peculiosa CR
  - Family: Ursidae (bears)
    - Genus: Ursus
      - Brown bear, U. arctos LC
        - Ussuri brown bear, U. a. lasiotus
      - Asiatic black bear, U. thibetanus VU
  - Family: Mustelidae (mustelids)
    - Genus: Lutra
      - European otter, L. lutra NT
    - Genus: Martes
      - Yellow-throated marten, Martes flavigula LR/lc
      - Sable, Martes zibellina LR/lc
    - Genus: Meles
      - Asian badger, Meles leucurus LR/lc
    - Genus: Mustela
      - Mountain weasel, Mustela altaica LR/lc
      - Least weasel, Mustela nivalis LR/lc
      - Siberian weasel, Mustela sibirica LR/lc
  - Family: Otariidae (eared seals, sealions)
    - Genus: Callorhinus
      - Northern fur seal, Callorhinus ursinus VU
    - Genus: Eumetopias
      - Steller's sea lion, Eumetopias jubatus NT vagrant
    - Genus: Zalophus
      - Japanese sea lion, Zalophus japonicus EX
  - Family: Phocidae (earless seals)
    - Genus: Phoca
      - Spotted seal, Phoca largha LC
      - Harbor seal, Phoca vitulina LR/lc
    - Genus: Pusa
      - Ringed seal (고리무늬물범), Pusa hispida LR/lc

== Order: Artiodactyla (even-toed ungulates) ==
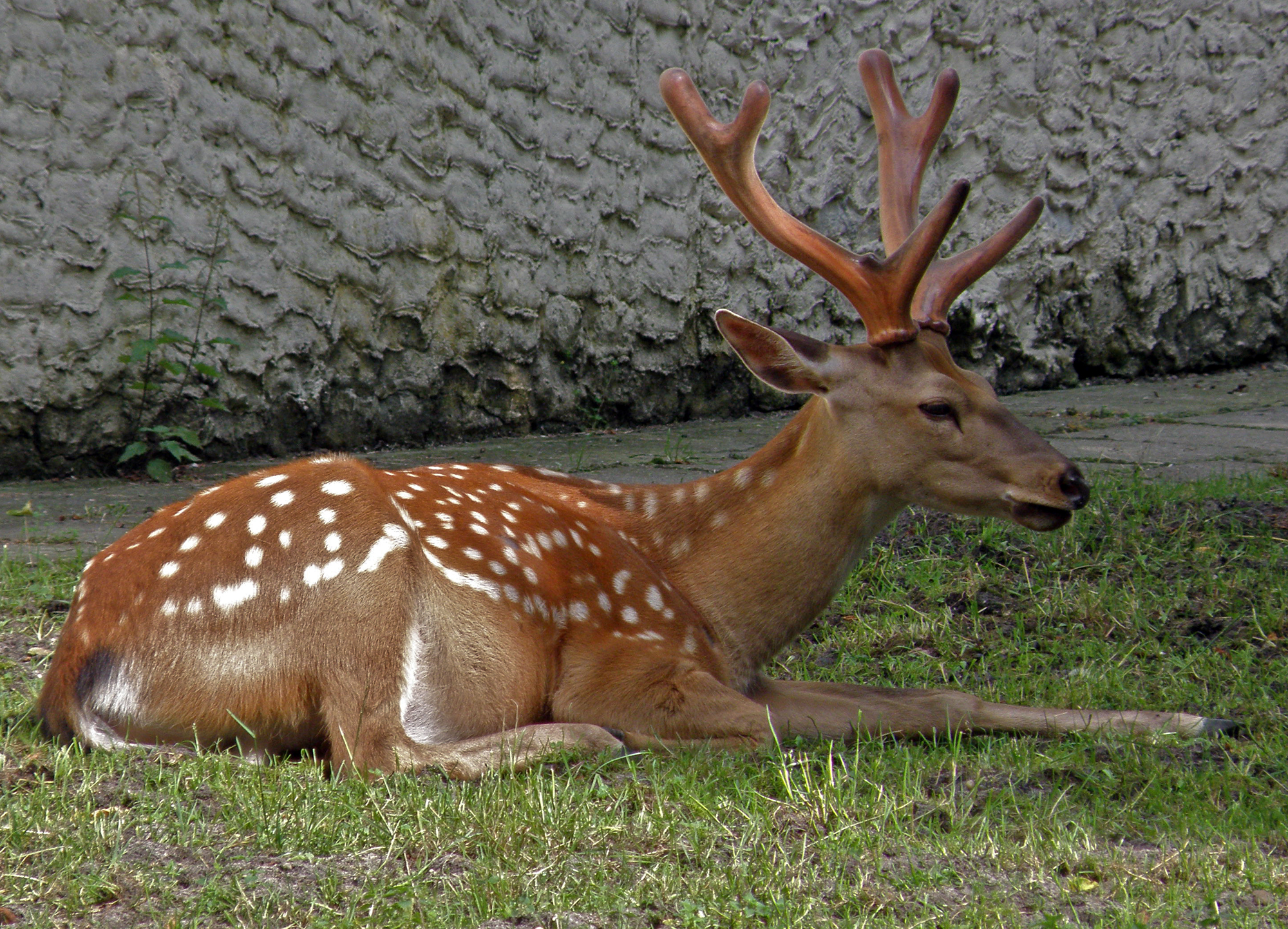
Manchurian sika deer

The even-toed ungulates are ungulates whose weight is borne about equally by the third and fourth toes, rather than mostly or entirely by the third as in perissodactyls. There are about 220 artiodactyl species, including many that are of great economic importance to humans.

- Family: Suidae (pigs)
  - Subfamily: Suinae
    - Genus: Sus
      - Wild boar, Sus scrofa LR/lc
- Family: Moschidae
  - Genus: Moschus
    - Siberian musk deer, Moschus moschiferus VU
- Family: Cervidae (deer)
  - Subfamily: Cervinae
    - Genus: Cervus
      - Elk, C. canadensis LC
        - Manchurian wapiti, C. c. xanthopygus
      - Sika deer, C. nippon LC possibly extirpated
        - Manchurian sika deer, C. n. mantchuricus LC possibly extirpated
  - Subfamily: Hydropotinae
    - Genus: Hydropotes
      - Water deer, Hydropotes inermis LR/nt
        - Korean water deer, Hydropotes inermis argyropus
  - Subfamily: Capreolinae
    - Genus: Capreolus
      - Siberian roe deer, Capreolus pygargus LR/lc
- Family: Bovidae (cattle, antelopes, sheep, goats)
  - Subfamily: Caprinae
    - Genus: Nemorhaedus
      - Long-tailed goral (산양), Nemorhaedus caudatus VU possibly extirpated

== See also ==
- Wildlife of Korea
- List of mammals of South Korea
- List of chordate orders
- Lists of mammals by region
- Mammal classification
