= List of mammals of the Faroe Islands =

This is a list of the mammal species recorded in the Faroe Islands. There are eleven mammal species in the Faroe Islands, of which two are endangered and two are vulnerable. This list is derived from the IUCN Red List and includes mammals that have recently been classified as extinct (since 1500 AD).

Icons which state each species' global IUCN status:
| CR | Critically Endangered | In imminent risk of extinction in the wild |
| EN | Endangered | Facing an extremely high risk of extinction in the wild |
| VU | Vulnerable | Facing a high risk of extinction in the wild |
| NT | Near Threatened | Doesn't meet any criteria that would categorise it as risking extinction but likely to in the future |
| LC | Least Concern | No current identifiable risks to this species |
| DD | Data Deficient | Inadequate information to make an assessment of the risks to this species |

== Order: Cetacea (whales) ==
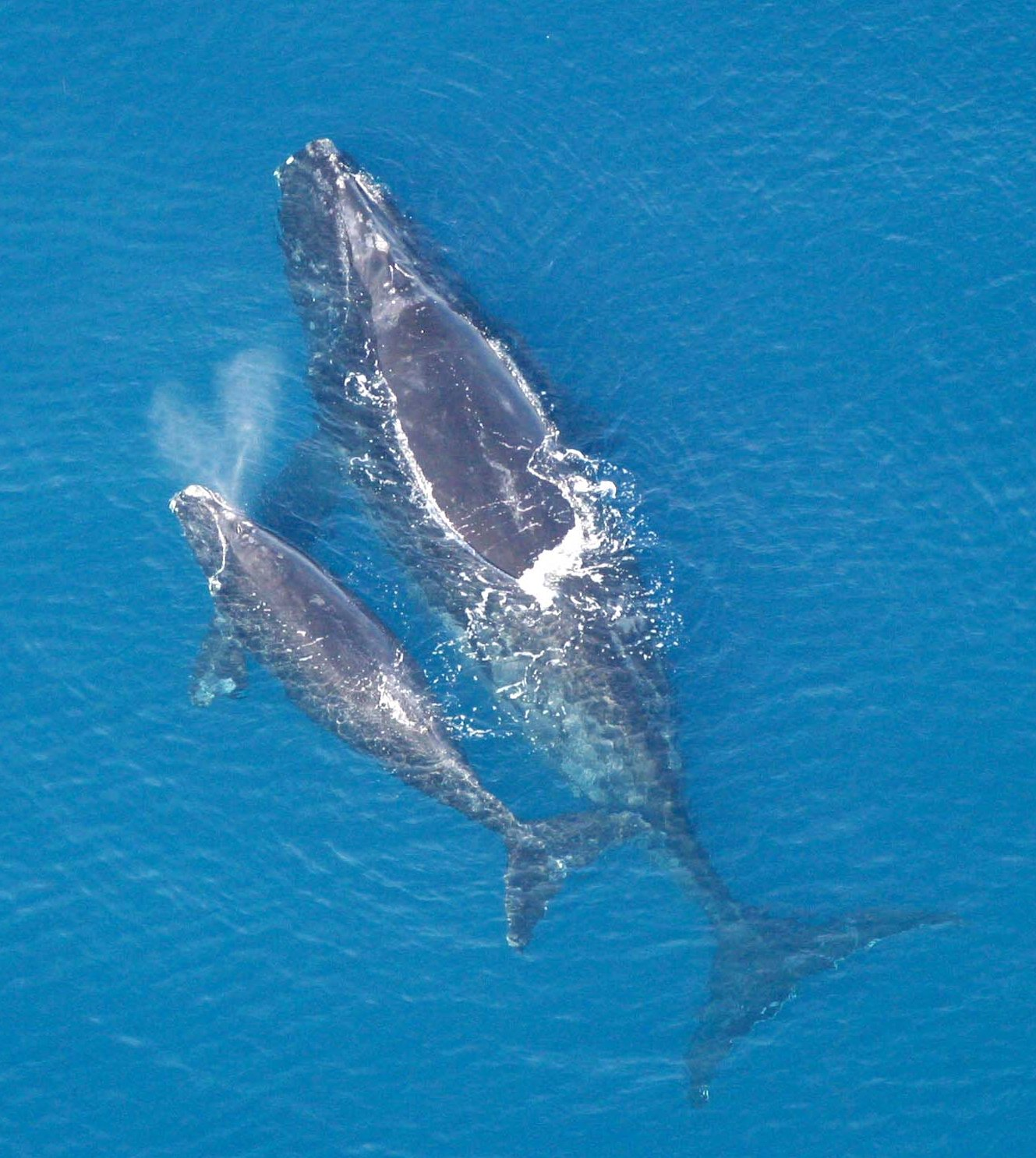
North Atlantic right whale

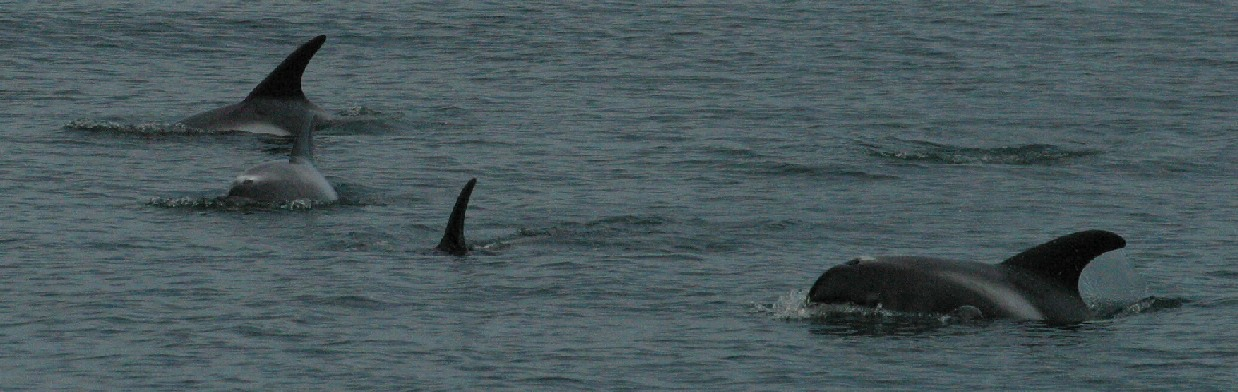
White-beaked dolphin

The order Cetacea includes whales, dolphins and porpoises. They are the mammals most fully adapted to aquatic life with a spindle-shaped nearly hairless body, protected by a thick layer of blubber, and forelimbs and tail modified to provide propulsion underwater.

- Suborder: Mysticeti
  - Family: Balaenidae
    - Genus: Eubalaena
      - North Atlantic right whale, Eubalaena glacialis CR
  - Family: Balaenopteridae
    - Subfamily: Balaenopterinae
      - Genus: Balaenoptera
        - Common minke whale, Balaenoptera acutorostrata LC
        - Sei whale, Balaenoptera borealis EN
        - Blue whale, Balaenoptera musculus EN
        - Fin whale, Balaenoptera physalus VU
      - Genus: Megaptera
        - Humpback whale, Megaptera novaeangliae LC
- Suborder: Odontoceti
  - Family Physeteridae
    - Genus Physeter
      - Sperm whale, Physeter macrocephalus VU
  - Family: Ziphidae
    - Genus: Hyperoodon
      - Northern bottlenose whale, Hyperoodon ampullatus NT
    - Genus Mesoplodon
      - Sowerby's beaked whale, Mesoplodon bidens LC
    - Genus Ziphius
      - Cuvier's beaked whale, Ziphius cavirostris LC
  - Family: Monodontidae
    - Genus: Delphinapterus
      - Beluga, Delphinapterus leucas LC
  - Family: Phocoenidae
    - Genus: Phocoena
      - Harbour porpoise, Phocoena phocoena LC
  - Family: Delphinidae (oceanic dolphins)
    - Genus Delphinus
      - Common dolphin, Delphinus delphis LC
    - Genus: Globicephala
      - Long-finned pilot whale, Globicephala melas LC
    - Genus Grampus
      - Risso's dolphin, Grampus griseus LC
    - Genus: Lagenorhynchus
      - White-beaked dolphin, Lagenorhynchus albirostris LC
    - Genus Leucopleurus
      - Atlantic white-sided dolphin, Leucopleurus acutus LC
    - Genus: Orcinus
      - Orca, Orcinus orca DD
    - Genus Tursiops
      - Bottlenose dolphin, Tursiops truncatus LC

== Order: Lagomorpha (lagomorphs) ==
- Family: Leporidae (rabbits and hares)
  - Genus: Lepus
    - Mountain hare, L. timidus LC introduced

== Order Rodentia (rodents) ==
- Family Muridae (mice and rats)
  - Genus: Rattus
    - Brown rat, Rattus norvegicus LC introduced
  - Genus: Mus
    - House mouse, Mus musculus LC introduced

== Order: Carnivora (carnivorans) ==
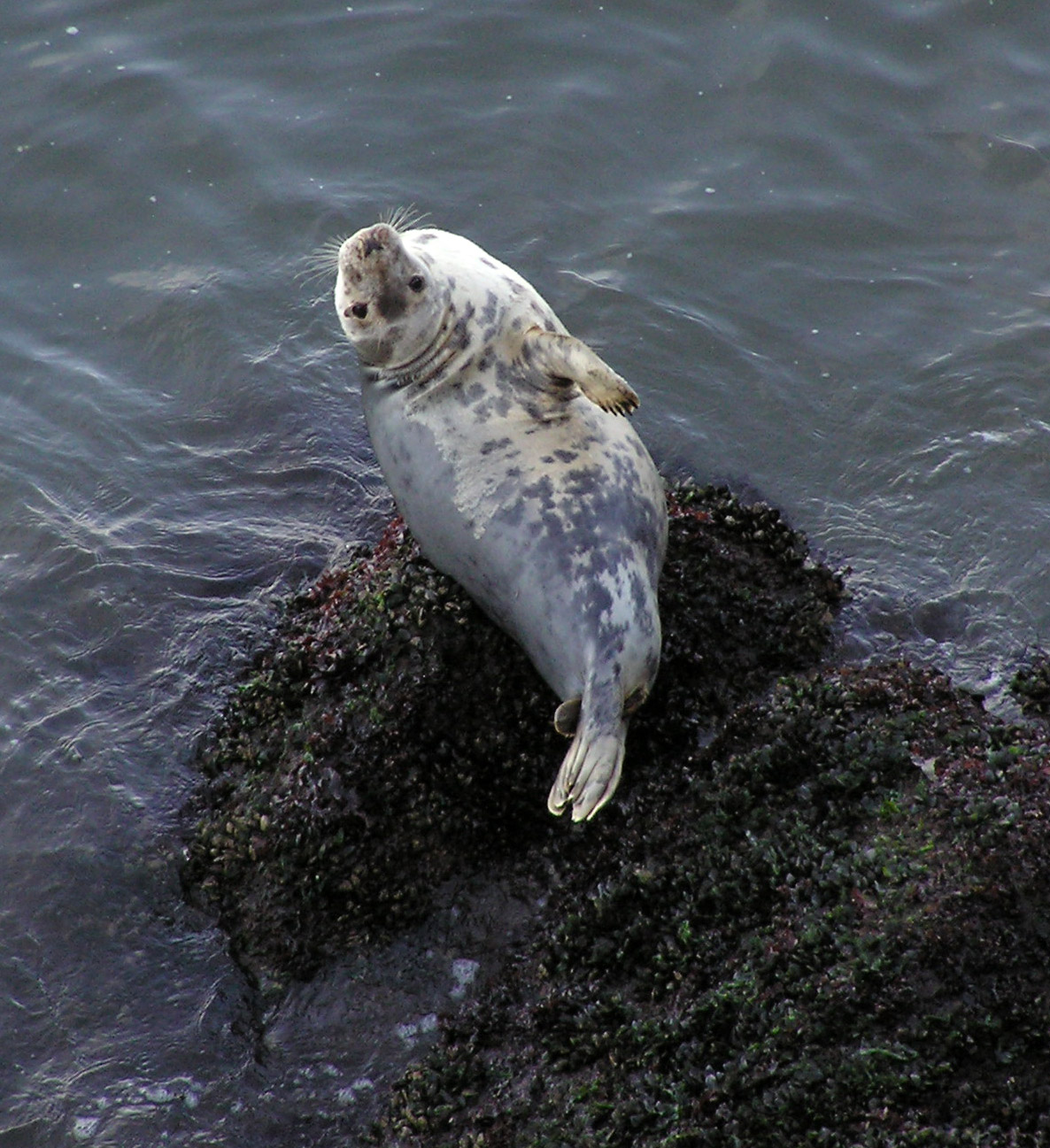
Grey seal

There are over 260 species of carnivorans worldwide, the majority of which feed primarily on meat. They have a characteristic skull shape and dentition. Seals are the only representatives of Carnivora on the Faroe Islands.

- Family: Phocidae (earless seals)
  - Genus: Halichoerus
    - Grey seal, Halichoerus grypus LC
  - Genus: Phoca
    - Harbor seal, P. vitulina LC
  - Genus: Cystophora
    - Hooded seal Cystophora cristata EN
  - Genus: Pagophilus
    - Harp seal, Pagophilus groenlandicus NT

== Order: Chiroptera (bats) ==
Bats have been increasingly recorded where they are thought to be either vagrants or artificially introduced. The bats' most distinguishing feature is that their forelimbs are developed as wings, making them the only mammals capable of flight.

- Family: Vespertilionidae
  - Subfamily: Vespertilioninae
    - Genus: Eptesicus
      - Northern bat, E. nilsonii LC vagrant or introduced
      - Serotine bat, E. serotinus LC vagrant or introduced
    - Genus: Nyctalus
      - Lesser noctule, N. leisleri LC vagrant or introduced
    - Genus: Pipistrellus
      - Nathusius' pipistrelle, P. nathusii LC vagrant or introduced
    - Genus: Vespertilio
      - Parti-coloured bat, V. murinus LC vagrant or introduced

== See also ==
- List of chordate orders
- Lists of mammals by region
- Mammal classification
