= Mammalia in the 10th edition of Systema Naturae =

Mammals in Carl Linnaeus's classification

The Mammalia in the 10th edition of Systema Naturae forms one of six classes of animals in Carl Linnaeus's tenth reformed edition written in Latin. The following explanations are based on William Turton's translations who rearranged and corrected earlier editions published by Johann Friedrich Gmelin, Johan Christian Fabricius and Carl Ludwig Willdenow:

Animals that suckle their young by means of lactiferous teats. In external and internal structure they resemble man: most of them are quadrupeds; and with man, their natural enemy, inhabit the surface of the Earth. The largest, though fewest in number, inhabit the ocean.

Linnaeus divided the mammals based on the number, situation, and structure of their teeth; mammals have the following characteristics:

- Heart: two auricles, two ventricles. Warm, dark red blood;
- Lungs: respires alternately;
- Jaw: incombent, covered. Teeth usually within jaw;
- Teats: lactiferous;
- Organs of sense: tongue, nostrils, eyes, ears, and papillae of the skin;
- Covering: hair, which is scanty in warm climates, hardly any on aquatics;
- Supports: four feet, except in aquatics; and in most a tail. Walks on the Earth and speaks.

Oldfield Thomas scrutinized Linnaeus's chapter on mammals in 1911 and attempted to find missing type species and type localities.

== Primates ==
Primates have four cutting upper parallel fore-teeth, except in some bat species which have two or none; solitary tusks in each jaw, one on each side; two pectoral teats; two feet and hands; flattened, oval nails; and they eat fruits.

Homo – humans of different races

- Homo sapiens
  - Homo americanus
  - Homo europaeus
  - Homo asiaticus
  - Homo afer
  - Homo monstrosus
- Homo troglodytes – partly based on myth, partly on orangutans

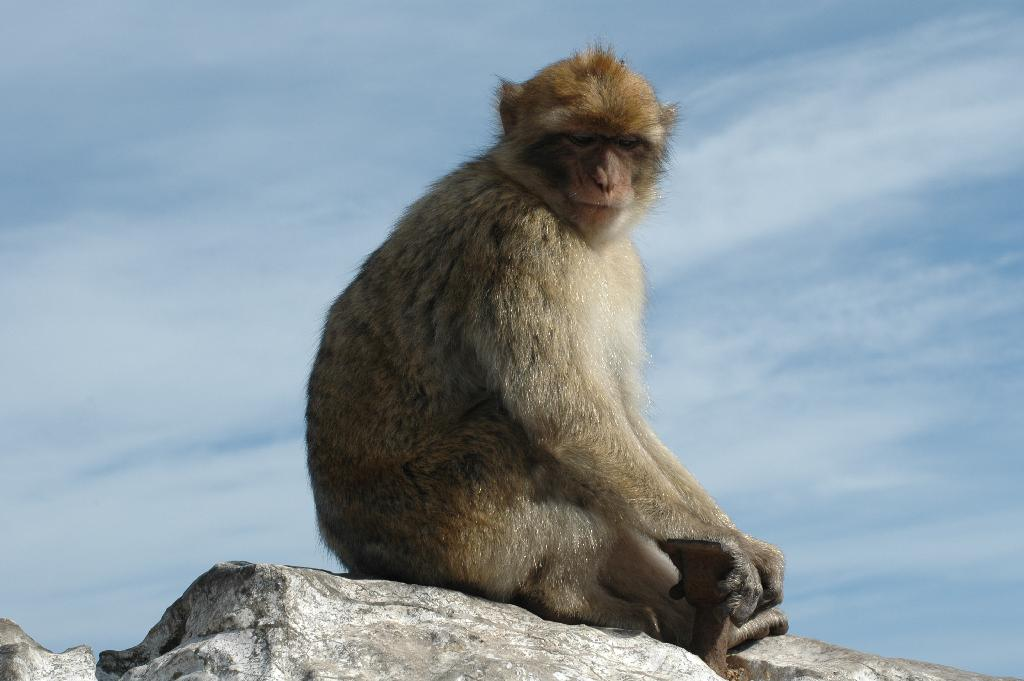
A Barbary macaque on the Rock of Gibraltar

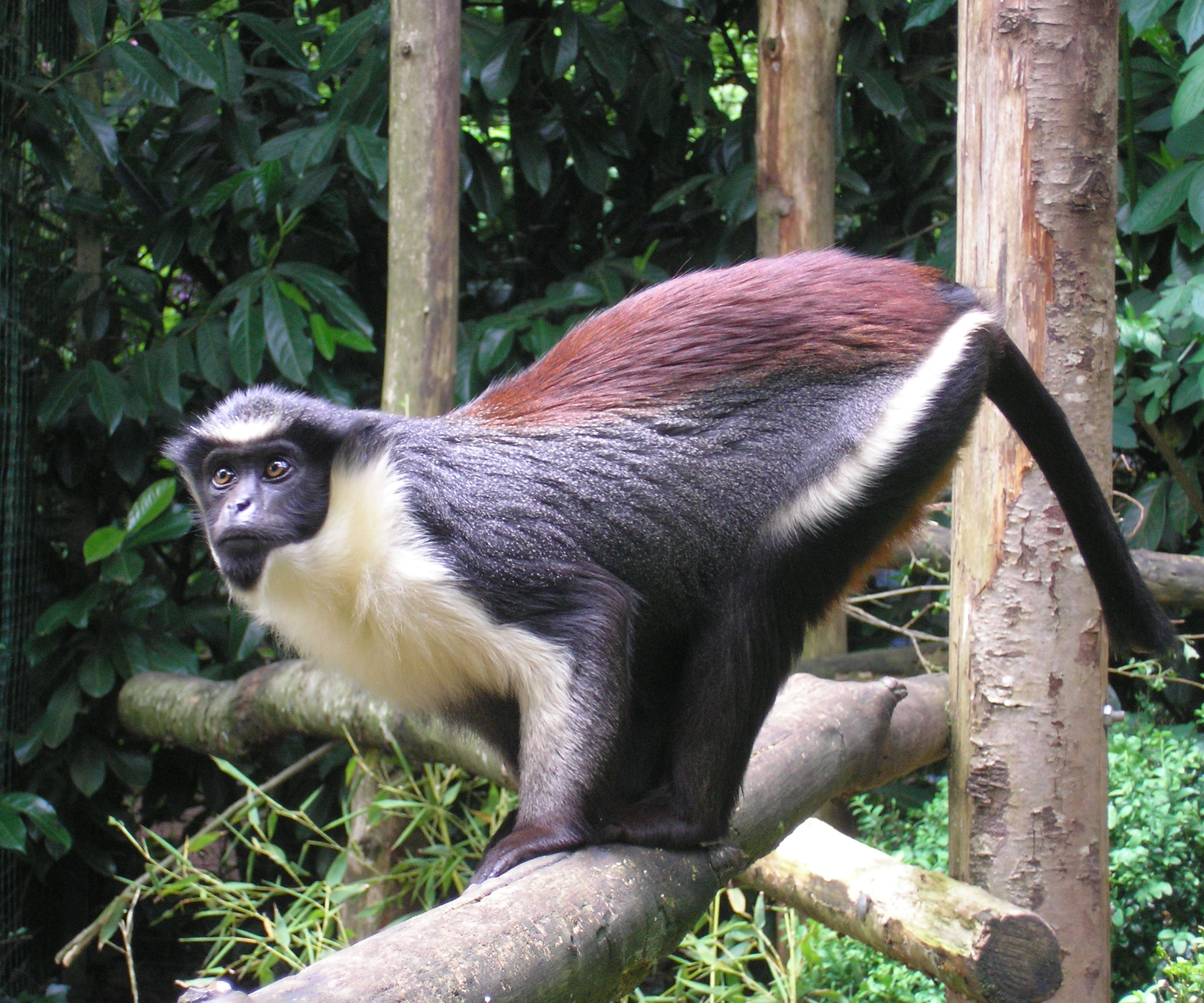
A captive Diana monkey

Simia – monkeys and chimps

- Simia satyrus – common chimpanzee and Bornean orangutan
- Simia sylvanus – Barbary macaque
- Simia sphinx – mandrill
- Simia apedia – nomen dubium
- Simia silenus – lion-tailed macaque
- Simia faunus – species cannot be determined
- Simia paniscus – red-faced spider monkey
- Simia diana – Diana monkey
- Simia cephus – moustached guenon
- Simia aygula – nomen oblitum for the crab-eating macaque
- Simia hamadryas – hamadryas baboon
- Simia jacchus – common marmoset
- Simia oedipus – cottontop tamarin
- Simia aethiops – grivet
- Simia midas – red-handed tamarin
- Simia cynamolgos – possibly crab-eating macaque
- Simia apella – tufted capuchin
- Simia morta – nomen dubium
- Simia capucina – white-headed capuchin
- Simia sciurea – common squirrel monkey
- Simia syrichta – Philippine tarsier

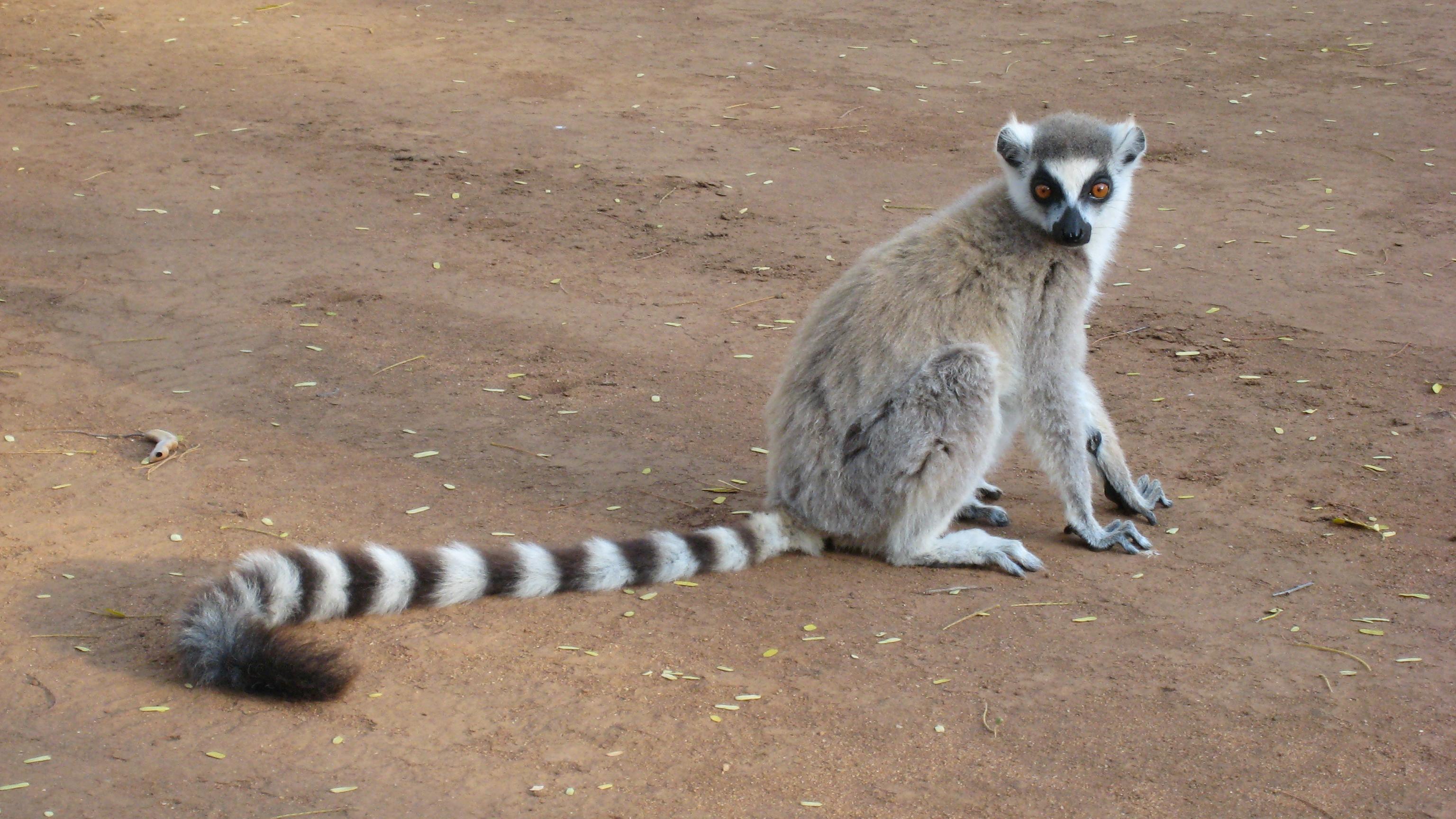
A ring-tailed lemur

Lemur – lemurs (Note: The current names of all Linnaeus' Lemur species are taken from Darwiniana.)

- Lemur tardigradus – red slender loris
- Lemur catta – ring-tailed lemur
- Lemur volans – Philippine flying lemur

Vespertilio – bats

- Vespertilio vampyrus – large flying fox
- Vespertilio spectrum – spectral vampire bat
- Vespertilio perspicillatus – Seba's short-tailed bat
- Vespertilio spasma – lesser false vampire bat
- Vespertilio leporinus – greater bulldog bat
- Vespertilio auritus – brown long-eared bat
- Vespertilio murinus – parti-coloured bat

== Bruta ==
Bruta do not have fore-teeth, but tusks, feet with strong hoof-like nails; move slowly and eat mostly masticated vegetables.

Elephas – elephants

- Elephas maximus – Asian elephant

Trichechus – herbivorus marine mammals

- Trichechus manatus – West Indian manatee

Bradypus – sloths

- Bradypus tridactylus – pale-throated sloth
- Bradypus didactylus – Linnaeus's two-toed sloth

Myrmecophaga – anteaters

- Myrmecophaga didactyla – silky anteater
- Myrmecophaga tridactyla – giant anteater
- Myrmecophaga tetradactyla – southern tamandua

Manis – pangolin

- Manis pentadactyla – Chinese pangolin

== Ferae ==
Ferae usually have six conic fore-teeth in each jaw, longer tusks, grinders with conic projections, feet with subulate claws, and feed on carcasses and prey on other animals.

Phoca – seals

- Phoca ursina – northern fur seal
- Phoca leonina – southern elephant seal
- Phoca rosmarus – walrus
- Phoca vitulina – harbour seal

Canis – dogs

- Canis familiaris – domestic dog
- Canis lupus – grey wolf
- Canis hyaena – striped hyena
- Canis vulpes – red fox
- Canis alopex – species cannot be determined
- Canis lagopus – Arctic fox
- Canis aureus – golden jackal

Felis – cats

- Felis leo – lion
- Felis tigris – tiger
- Felis pardus – leopard
- Felis onca – jaguar
- Felis pardalis – ocelot
- Felis catus – domestic cat
- Felis lynx – Eurasian lynx

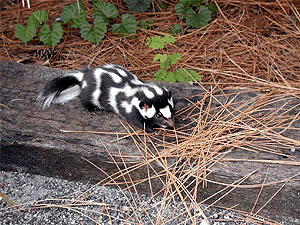
An eastern spotted skunk

Viverra – skunks, mongooses, and genets

- Viverra ichneumon – Egyptian mongoose
- Viverra mephitis – striped skunk
- Viverra putorius – eastern spotted skunk
- Viverra zibetha – large Indian civet
- Viverra genetta – common genet

Mustela – weasels, otters, and martens

- Mustela lutris – sea otter
- Mustela lutra – Eurasian river otter
- Mustela gulo – wolverine
- Mustela barbara – tayra
- Mustela martes – European pine marten
- Mustela putorius – wild ferret
- Mustela furo – ferret
- Mustela zibellina – sable
- Mustela erminea – stoat
- Mustela lutreola – European mink

Ursus – bears, badgers, and raccoons

- Ursus arctos – brown bear
- Ursus luscus – wolverine
- Ursus meles – Eurasian badger
- Ursus lotor – northern raccoon

== Bestiae ==
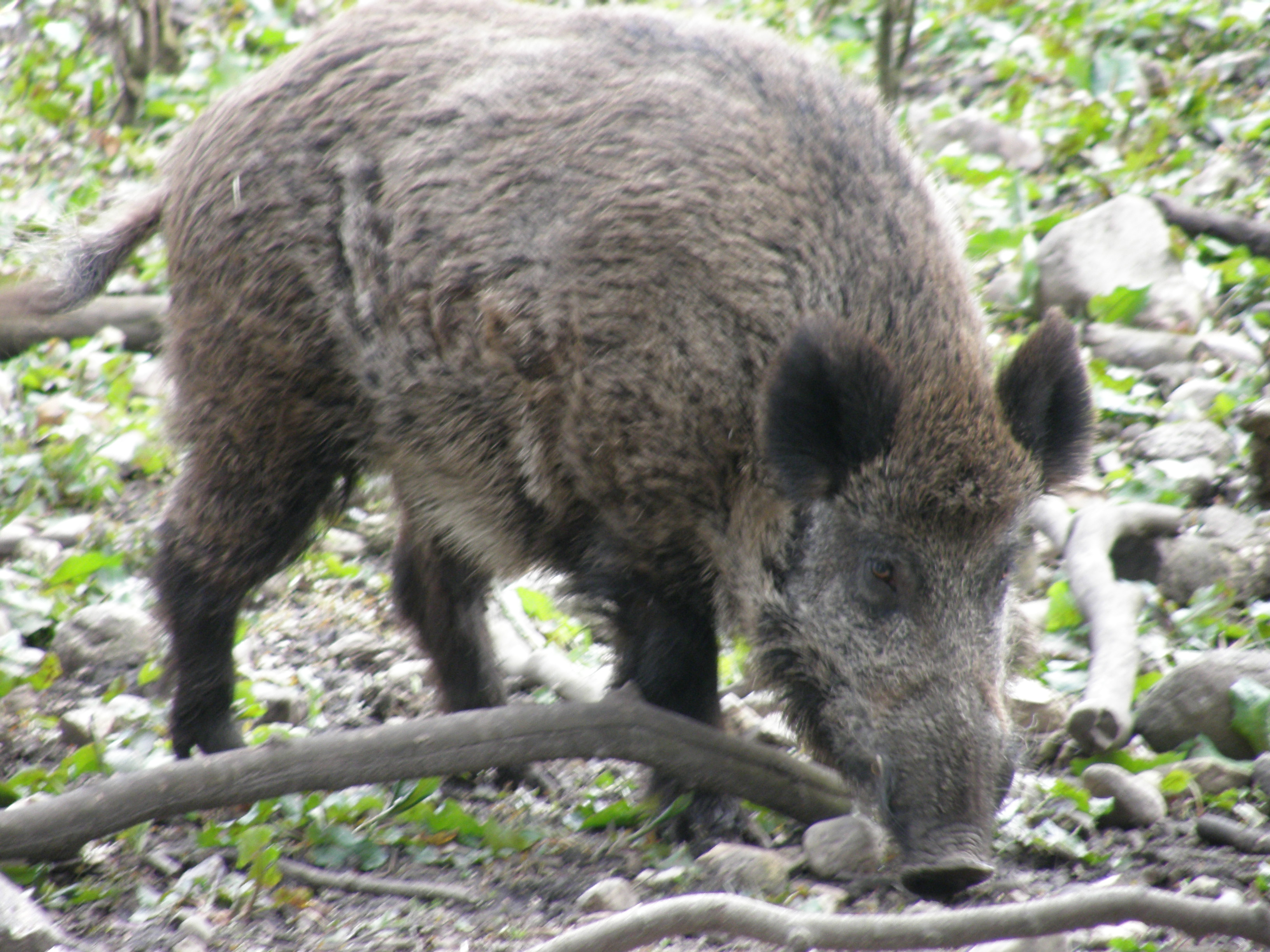
A wild boar

Bestiae have indefinite numbers of fore-teeth on the sides, always one extra canine, an elongate nose used to dig out juicy roots and vermin.

Sus – pigs

- Sus scrofa – wild boar
- Sus porcus – red river hog
- Sus tajacu – collared peccary
- Sus babyrusa – Buru babirusa

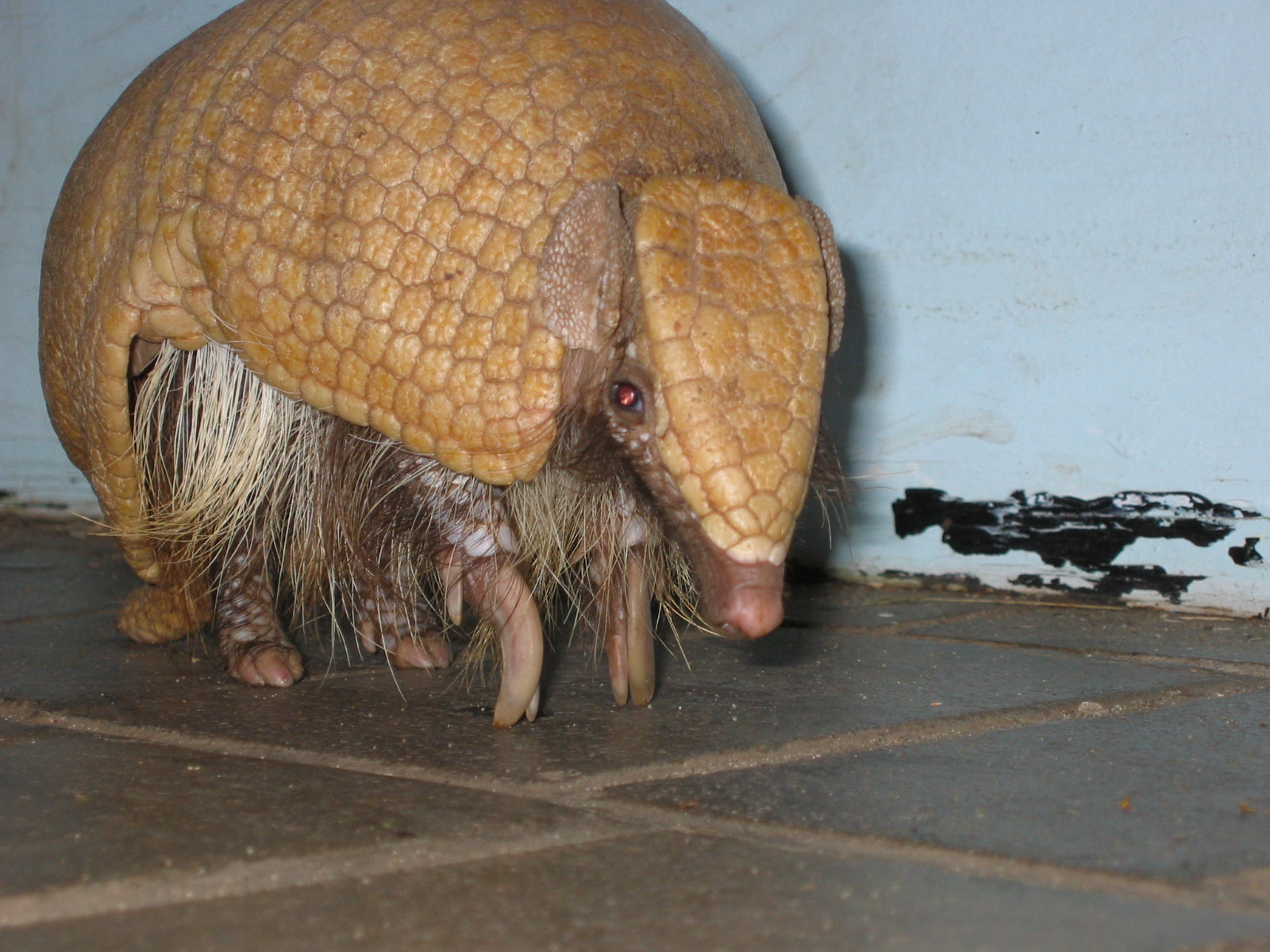
Brazilian three-banded armadillo in Edmonton Zoo

Dasypus – armadillos

- Dasypus unicinctus – southern naked-tailed armadillo
- Dasypus tricinctus – Brazilian three-banded armadillo
- Dasypus quadricinctus − synonym of tricinctus
- Dasypus sexcinctus – six-banded armadillo
- Dasypus septemcinctus – seven-banded armadillo
- Dasypus novemcinctus – nine-banded armadillo

Erinaceus – hedgehogs

- Erinaceus europaeus – European hedgehog

Talpa – moles

- Talpa europaea – European mole
- Talpa asiatica – Cape golden mole

Sorex – shrews

- Sorex araneus – common shrew
- Sorex cristatus – star-nosed mole
- Sorex aquaticus – eastern mole

Didelphis – opossums

- Didelphis marsupialis – common opossum
- Didelphis philander – bare-tailed woolly opossum
- Didelphis opossum – grey four-eyed opossum
- Didelphis murina – Linnaeus's mouse opossum
- Didelphis dorsigera − synonym of murina

== Glires ==
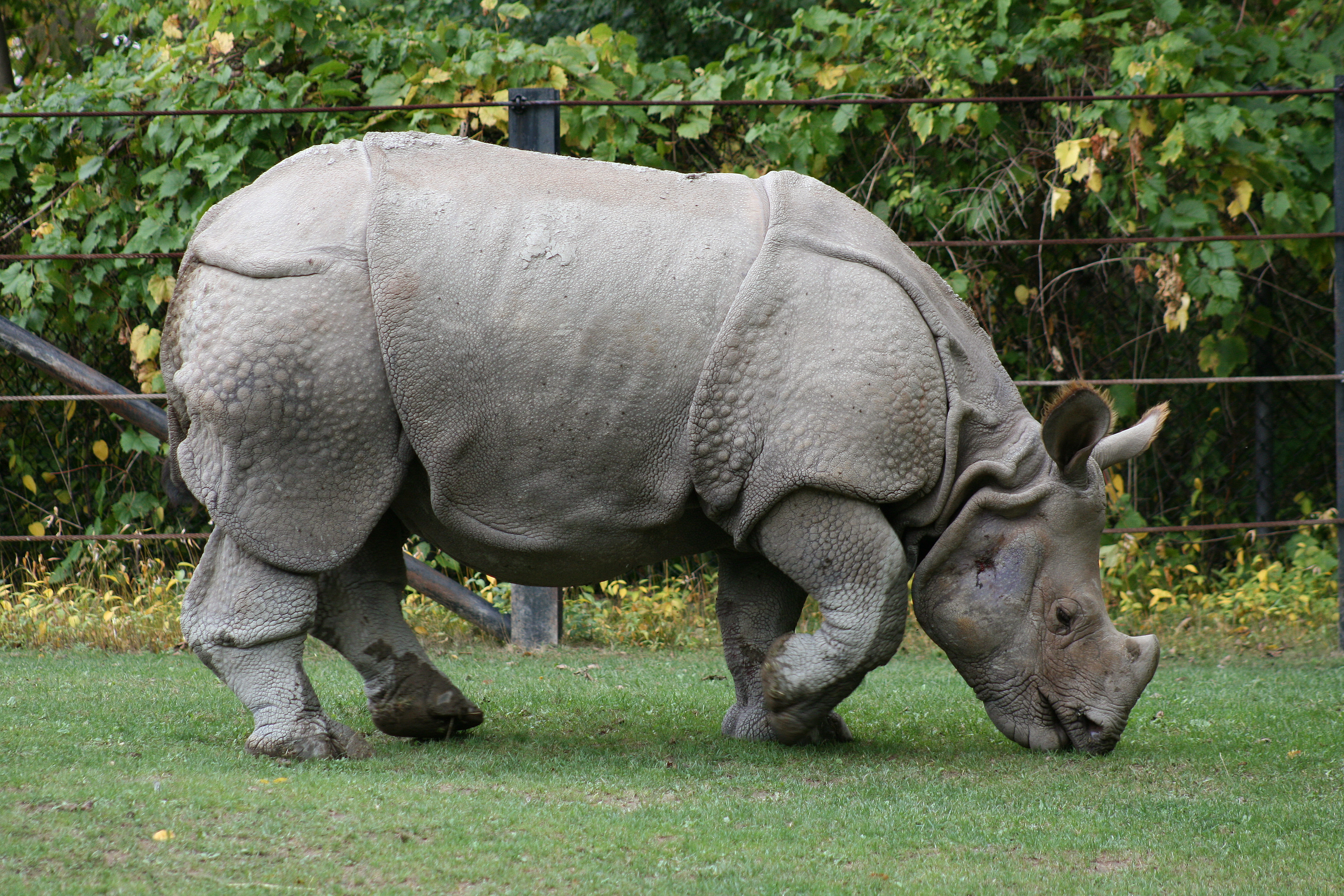
An Indian rhinoceros

Glires have two cutting fore-teeth in each jaw, but no tusks, feet with claws formed for running and bounding, and eat bark, roots, and vegetables, which they gnaw.

Rhinoceros – rhinos

- Rhinoceros unicornis – Indian rhinoceros
- Rhinoceros bicornis – black rhinoceros

Hystrix – porcupines

- Hystrix cristata – crested porcupine
- Hystrix prehensilis – Brazilian porcupine
- Hystrix dorsata – North American porcupine
- Hystrix macroura – Asiatic brush-tailed porcupine
- Hystrix brachyura – Malayan porcupine

Lepus – hares

- Lepus timidus – common hare
- Lepus cuniculus – European rabbit
- Lepus capensis – Cape hare
- Lepus brasiliensis – Common tapetí

Castor – beavers and desmans

- Castor fiber – European beaver
- Castor moschatus – Russian desman

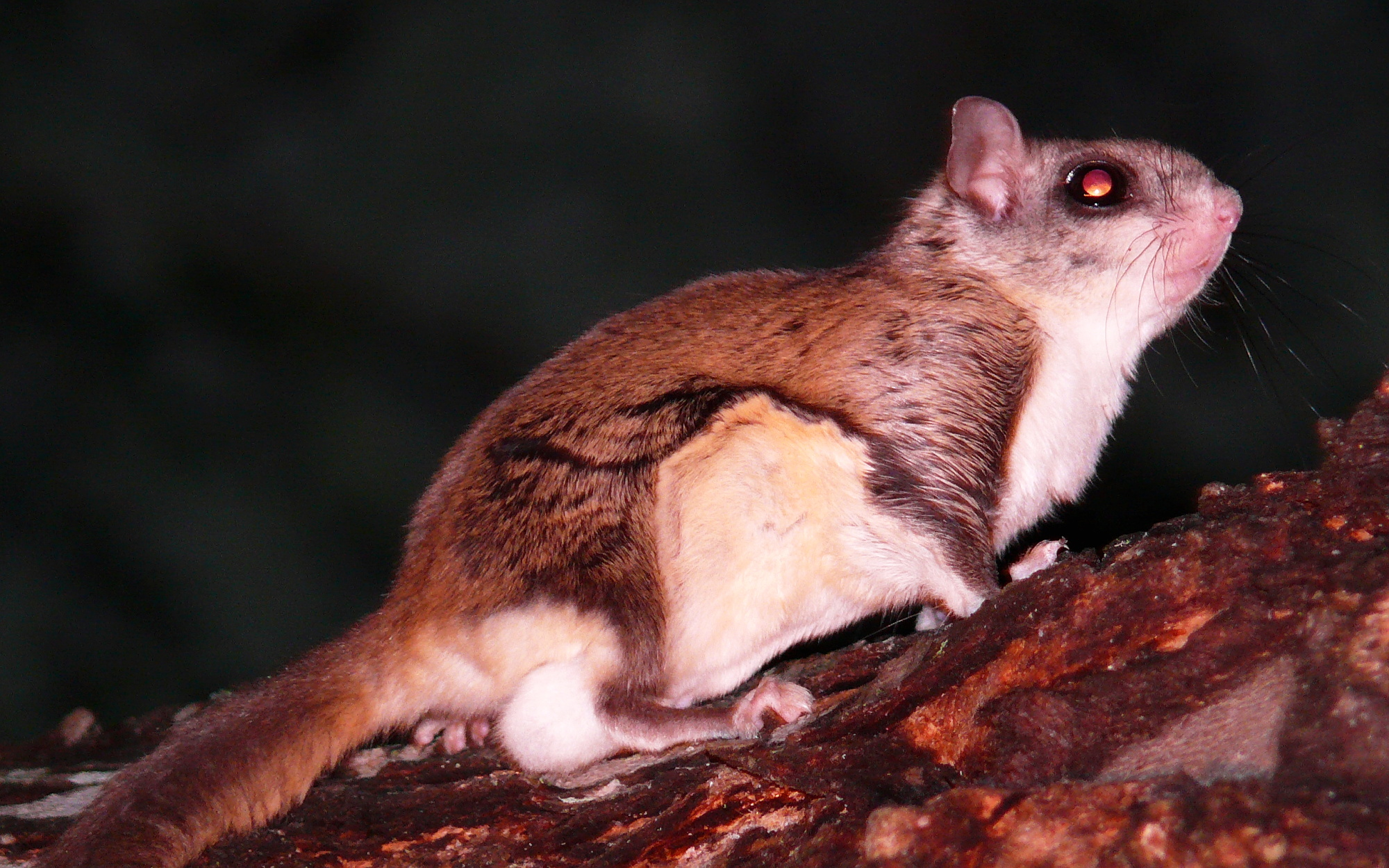
A southern flying squirrel

Mus – mice and squirrels

- Mus porcellus – Guinea pig
- Mus leporinus – red-rumped agouti
- Mus lemmus – Norway lemming
- Mus marmota – Alpine marmot
- Mus monax – groundhog
- Mus cricetus – European hamster
- Mus terrestris
- Mus amphibius – European water vole
- Mus rattus – black rat
- Mus musculus – house mouse
- Mus avellanarius – hazel dormouse
- Mus sylvaticus – wood mouse
- Mus striatus – typical striped grass mouse
- Mus longipes - [nomen dubium, no type specimen specified]
- Mus jaculus – lesser Egyptian jerboa
- Mus volans – southern flying squirrel

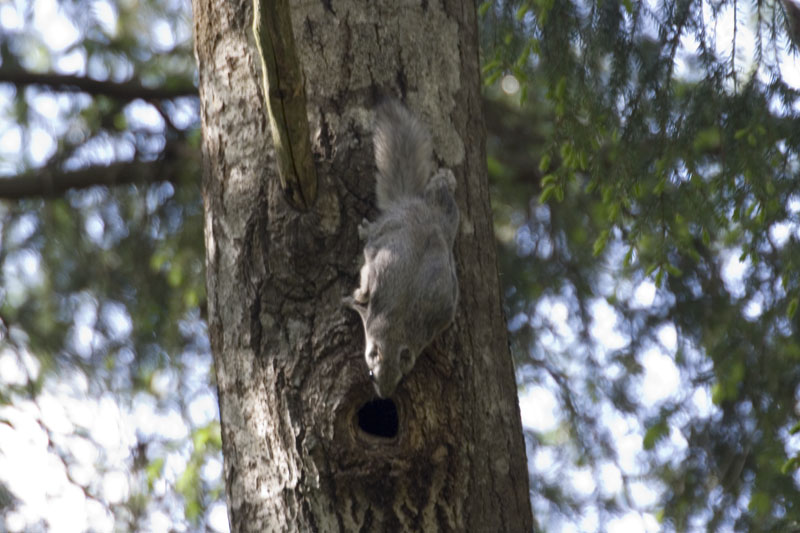
A Siberian flying squirrel

Sciurus – more squirrels

- Sciurus vulgaris – red squirrel
- Sciurus niger – fox squirrel
- Sciurus cinereus – Delmarva fox squirrel
- Sciurus flavus – [nomen dubium]
- Sciurus getulus – Barbary ground squirrel
- Sciurus striatus – eastern chipmunk
- Sciurus volans – Siberian flying squirrel

== Pecora ==
Pecora do not have upper, not many lower cutting fore-teeth, hoofed, cloven feet, and feed on herbs which they pluck, chewing the cud; four stomachs, a paunch for macerating and ruminating food, a bonnet for reticulating and receiving it, an omasus or maniplies of numerous folds for digesting it, and an abomasus or caille, fasciate, for giving it acescency and preventing putrefaction.

Camelus – camels

- Camelus dromedarius – dromedary camel
- Camelus bactrianus – domestic Bactrian camel
- Camelus glama – domestic llama
- Camelus pacos – domestic alpaca

Moschus – musk deer

- Moschus moschiferus – Siberian musk deer

Cervus – deer

- Cervus camelopardalis – giraffe
- Cervus alces – elk
- Cervus elaphus – red deer
- Cervus tarandus – reindeer
- Cervus dama – fallow deer
- Cervus bezoarticus – pampas deer
- Cervus capreolus – roe deer
- Cervus guineensis – [nomen dubium]

Capra – goats

- Capra hircus – goat
- Capra ibex – Alpine ibex
- Capra rupicapra – chamois
- Capra depressa – cannot be determined
- Capra reversa – cannot be determined
- Capra pygmea – royal antelope
- Capra gazella – gemsbok
- Capra cervicapra – blackbuck
- Capra dorcas – dorcas gazelle
- Capra grimmia – common duiker
- Capra mambrica – a long-eared domestic goat from Syria
- Capra ammon – argali

Ovis – sheep

- Ovis aries – domestic sheep
- Ovis guineensis – domestic sheep from Guinea
- Ovis strepsiceros – domestic sheep from Crete

Bos – cows and bison

- Bos taurus – cow
- Bos bonasus – European bison
- Bos bison – American bison
- Bos bubalis – domestic water buffalo
- Bos indicus – zebu

== Bellua ==
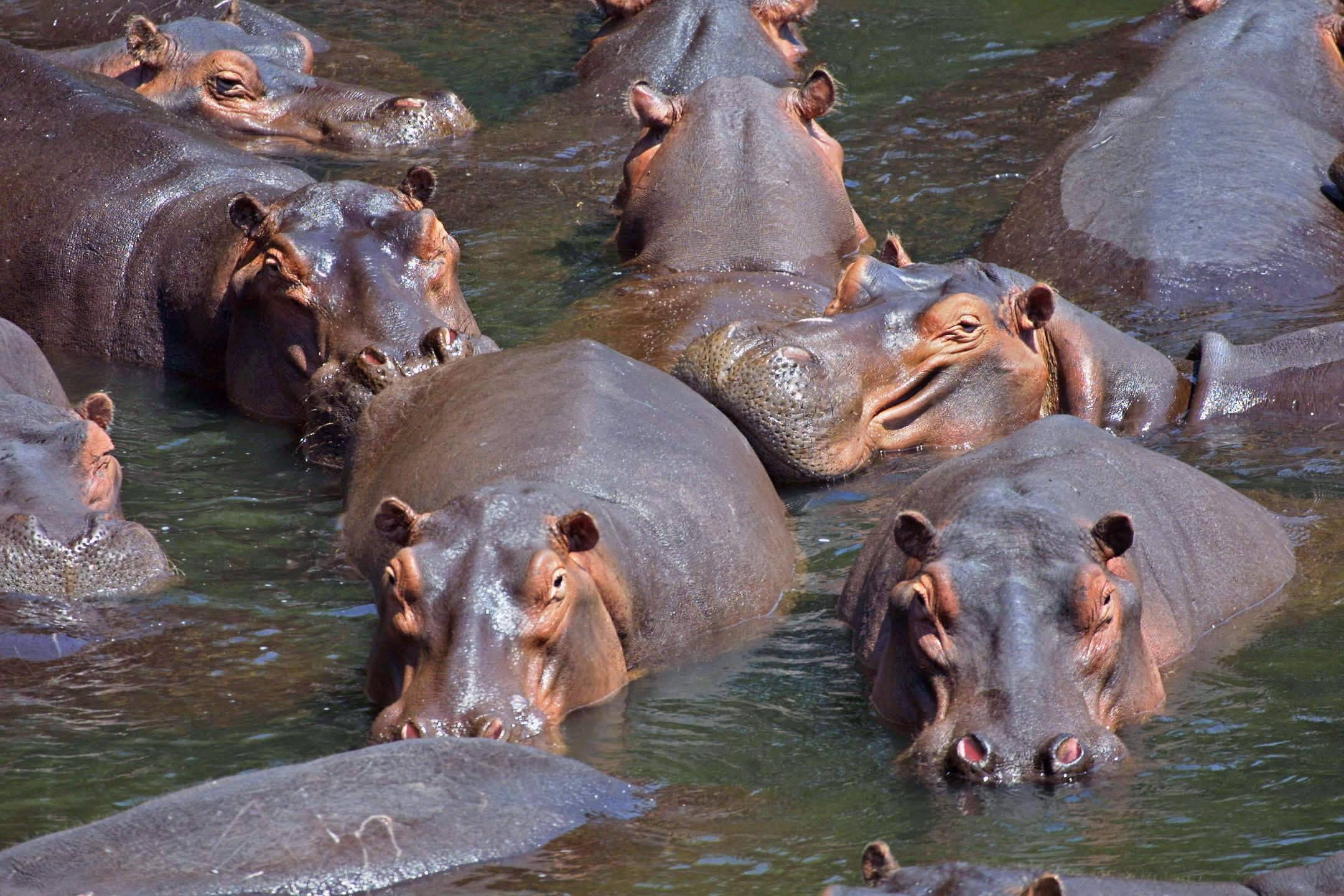
A hippopotamus

Bellua have obtuse fore-teeth, hoofed feet, move heavily, and feed on vegetables.

Equus – horses

- Equus caballus – horse
- Equus asinus – donkey
- Equus zebra – mountain zebra

Hippopotamus – hippos and tapirs

- Hippopotamus amphibius – hippopotamus
- Hippopotamus terrestris – South American tapir

== Cete ==
Cete have some cartilaginous, some bony teeth, no nostrils but a fistulous opening in the anterior and upper part of the head, pectoral fins instead of feet, horizontal, flattened tails, no claws, live in the ocean, and feed on mollusca and fish.

Monodon – narwhal

- Monodon monoceros – narwhal

Balaena – baleen whales

- Balaena mysticetus – bowhead whale
- Balaena physalus – fin whale
- Balaena boops – unknown
- Balaena musculus – blue whale

Physeter – sperm whales and cryptid whales

- Physeter catodon – either Beluga or sperm whale
- Physeter macrocephalus sperm whale
- Physeter miscrops
- Physeter tursio – possibly a cryptid whale

Delphinus – dolphins, porpoises and orcas

- Delphinus phocoena – harbour porpoise
- Delphinus delphis – short-beaked common dolphin
- Delphinus orca – orca
