= Simia =

Obsolete primate taxon

In his Systema Naturae of 1758, Carl Linnaeus divided the Order Primates within Mammalia into four genera: Homo, Simia, Lemur, and Vespertilio. His Vespertilio included all bats, and has since been moved from Primates to Chiroptera. Homo contained humans, Lemur contained four lemurs and a colugo, and Simia contained the other Primates. Linnaeus did not think that Homo should form a distinct group from Simia, classifying them separately mainly to avoid conflict with religious authorities. If this is taken into account, Simia (including Homo) would be roughly equivalent to the Suborder Haplorhini of the Primates (while Lemur would be roughly equivalent to the Suborder Strepsirrhini).

Homo, Lemur, and Vespertilio have survived as generic names, but Simia has not. All the species have since been moved to other genera, and in 1929, the International Commission on Zoological Nomenclature ruled in its Opinion 114 that Simia be suppressed. The genus Simias is distinct and remains valid, containing a single species, the pig-tailed langur (Simias concolor).

The original genus Simia came to include these species:

Modern genus	Modern common name	Original scientific name
Carlito Groves and Shekelle, 2010	Philippine tarsier	Simia syrichta Linnaeus, 1758
Callithrix Erxleben, 1777	Silvery marmoset	Simia argentata Linnaeus, 1771
Callithrix Erxleben, 1777	Common marmoset	Simia jacchus Linnaeus, 1758
Leontopithecus Lesson, 1840	Golden lion tamarin	Simia rosalia Linnaeus, 1766
Saguinus Hoffmannsegg, 1807	Brown-mantled tamarin	Simia leonina Humboldt, 1806
Saguinus Hoffmannsegg, 1807	Red-handed tamarin	Simia midas Linnaeus, 1758
Saguinus Hoffmannsegg, 1807	Cotton-top tamarin	Simia oedipus Linnaeus, 1758
Cebus Erxleben, 1777	White-fronted capuchin	Simia albifrons Humboldt, 1812
Cebus Erxleben, 1777	White-headed capuchin	Simia capucina Linnaeus, 1758
Cebus Erxleben, 1777	Tufted capuchin	Simia apella Linnaeus, 1758
Cebus Erxleben, 1777	Tufted capuchin	Simia fatuellus Linnaeus, 1766
Saimiri Voigt, 1831	Common squirrel monkey	Simia sciurea Linnaeus, 1758
Alouatta Lacépède, 1799	Red-handed howler	Simia belzebul Linnaeus, 1766
Alouatta Lacépède, 1799	Venezuelan red howler	Simia seniculus Linnaeus, 1766
Ateles É. Geoffroy, 1806	Red-faced spider monkey	Simia paniscus Linnaeus, 1758
Lagothrix É. Geoffroy, 1812	Brown woolly monkey	Simia lagotricha Humboldt, 1812
Pithecia Desmarest, 1804	White-faced saki	Simia pithecia Linnaeus, 1766
Chiropotes Lesson, 1840	Black bearded saki	Simia chiropotes Humboldt, 1812
Callicebus Thomas, 1903	Black titi	Simia lugens Humboldt, 1812?
Callicebus Thomas, 1903	Atlantic titi	Simia personatus É. Geoffroy, 1812
Chlorocebus Gray, 1870	Grivet	Simia aethiops Linnaeus, 1758
Chlorocebus Gray, 1870	Green monkey	Simia sabacea Linnaeus, 1766
Cercopithecus Linnaeus, 1758 (named as a subsection of Simia)	Moustached guenon	Simia cephus Linnaeus, 1758
Cercopithecus Linnaeus, 1758 (named as a subsection of Simia)	Diana monkey	Simia diana Linnaeus, 1758
Cercopithecus Linnaeus, 1758 (named as a subsection of Simia)	Diana monkey	Simia faunus Linnaeus, 1758
Cercopithecus Linnaeus, 1758 (named as a subsection of Simia)	Greater spot-nosed monkey	Simia nictitans Linnaeus, 1766
Macaca Lacépède, 1799	Crab-eating macaque	Simia aygula Linnaeus, 1758
Macaca Lacépède, 1799	Barbary macaque	?Simia cynamolgos Linnaeus, 1758
Macaca Lacépède, 1799	Barbary macaque	?Simia cynomolgus Linnaeus, 1766
Macaca Lacépède, 1799	Barbary macaque	Simia inuus Linnaeus, 1766
Macaca Lacépède, 1799	Barbary macaque	Simia sylvanus Linnaeus, 1758
Macaca Lacépède, 1799	Southern pig-tailed macaque	Simia nemestrina Linnaeus, 1766
Macaca Lacépède, 1799	Lion-tailed macaque	Simia silenus Linnaeus, 1758
Macaca Lacépède, 1799	Toque macaque	Simia sinica Linnaeus, 1771
Papio Erxleben, 1777	Hamadryas baboon	Simia hamadryas Linnaeus, 1758
Papio Erxleben, 1777	Yellow baboon	Simia cynocephalus Linnaeus, 1766
Mandrillus Ritgen, 1824	Mandrill	Simia sphinx Linnaeus, 1758
Mandrillus Ritgen, 1824	Mandrill	Simia maimon Linnaeus, 1766
Pygathrix É. Geoffroy, 1812	Red-shanked douc	Simia nemaeus Linnaeus, 1771
Pongo Lacépède, 1799	Bornean orangutan	Simia pygmaeus Linnaeus, 1760
Pongo Lacépède, 1799	Bornean orangutan	Simia satyrus Linnaeus, 1758
Pan Oken, 1816	Common chimpanzee	Simia satyrus Linnaeus, 1758
Pan Oken, 1816	Common chimpanzee	Simia troglodytes Blumenbach, 1775
(unknown)		Simia apedia Linnaeus, 1758
(unknown)		Simia morta Linnaeus, 1758
(unknown)		Simia trepida Linnaeus, 1766
(unknown)		Simia veter Linnaeus, 1766

== See also ==
- Mammalia in the 10th edition of Systema Naturae
