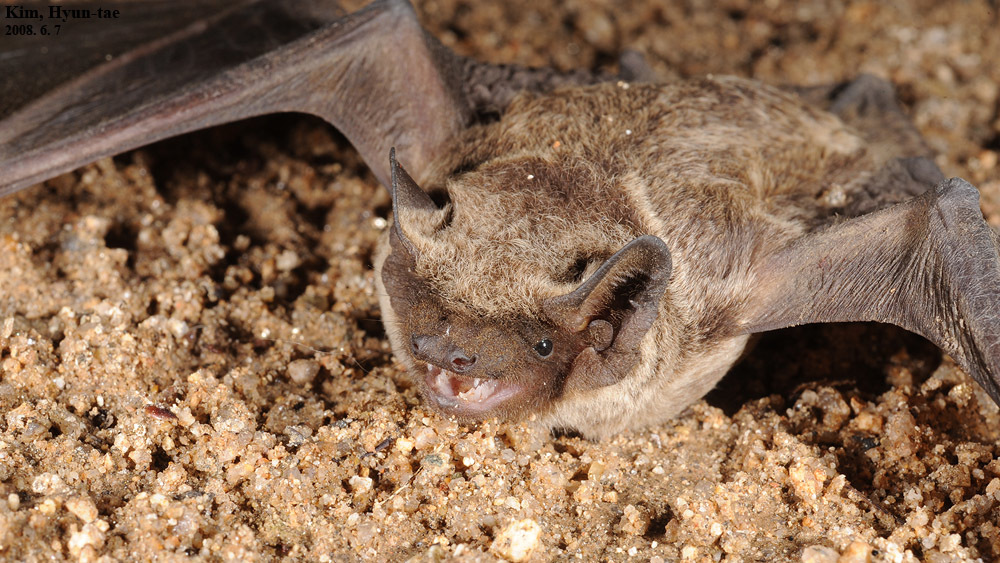

Conservation status
- Least Concern (IUCN 3.1)

Scientific classification
- Kingdom: Animalia
- Phylum: Chordata
- Class: Mammalia
- Order: Chiroptera
- Family: Vespertilionidae
- Genus: Vespertilio
- Species: V. sinensis

Binomial name
- Vespertilio sinensis Peters, 1880

Synonyms
- Vespertilio orientalis Wallin, 1969; Vesperus sinensis Peters, 1880; Vespertilio superans Thomas, 1898

= Asian particolored bat =

Asian parti colored bat

Species of bat

The Asian parti-colored bat (Vespertilio sinensis) is a species of parti-coloured bat. An adult Asian parti-colored bat has a body length of 6–7 cm (2.4–2.8 in), a tail of 4.3–4.5 cm (1.7–1.8 in), and a wing length of 5 cm (2.0 in). Asian parti-colored bats are distributed across East Asia, from Taiwan through eastern China, eastern Mongolia and Russia (Siberia) to the Korean Peninsula and Japan (Hokkaido, Honshu, Shikoku, and Kyushu).

== Taxonomy and etymology ==
It was described as a new species in 1880 by German naturalist Wilhelm Peters. Peters named it Vesperus sinensis. Its species name "sinensis" comes from Latin Sinae, meaning "China." The holotype was collected in Beijing. The species was known as V. superans until 1997 when it was demonstrated that V. sinensis should be used under the nomenclature rule known as the Principle of Priority.

== Description ==
Its forearm length is 43–55 mm (1.7–2.2 in). Its hairs are bicolored, with the basal portions blackish brown and the distal portions off-white.

== Range and habitat ==
Its range includes several countries and regions in eastern Asia, such as China and Taiwan, Japan, North and South Korea, Mongolia, and Siberia.

== Conservation ==
As of 2019, it is evaluated as a least-concern species by the IUCN.
