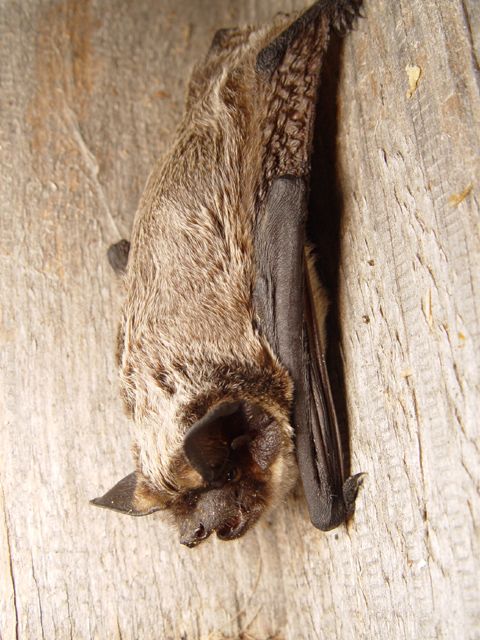
- Parti-coloured bat, Vespertilio murinus

Scientific classification
- Kingdom: Animalia
- Phylum: Chordata
- Class: Mammalia
- Order: Chiroptera
- Family: Vespertilionidae
- Genus: Vespertilio; Linnaeus, 1758

Type species
- Vespertilio murinus Linnaeus, 1758

= Vespertilio =

Genus of bats

Vespertilio is a genus of bats in the family Vespertilionidae. The common name for this family is vesper bats, which is a better-known classification than Vespertilio. They are also known as frosted bats.

Species within the genus Vespertilio are:

- Parti-coloured bat, Vespertilio murinus
- Asian parti-coloured bat, Vespertilio sinensis

== History ==
Vespertilio is the oldest accepted genus name for bats. When Vespertilio was described in 1758, it was equivalent to the modern taxonomic order, encompassing all chiropterans, which Carl Linnaeus grouped with the primates due to certain characteristics mentioned by Linnaeus that bats seemed to share with actual primates. The second chiropteran genus, Pteropus, was described four years later in 1762. Vespertilio, as the oldest genus name, is thus the type genus of the family Vespertilionidae, which was not described until 1821. Variably, until 1779, Vespertilio was considered either the only chiropteran genus, or one of two, including Pteropus. It was considered by some to be the only genus of bats until as late as 1817.
