= Gunnersbury Triangle =

Nature reserve in Ealing and Hounslow, UK

- IUCN category IV (habitat/species management area)
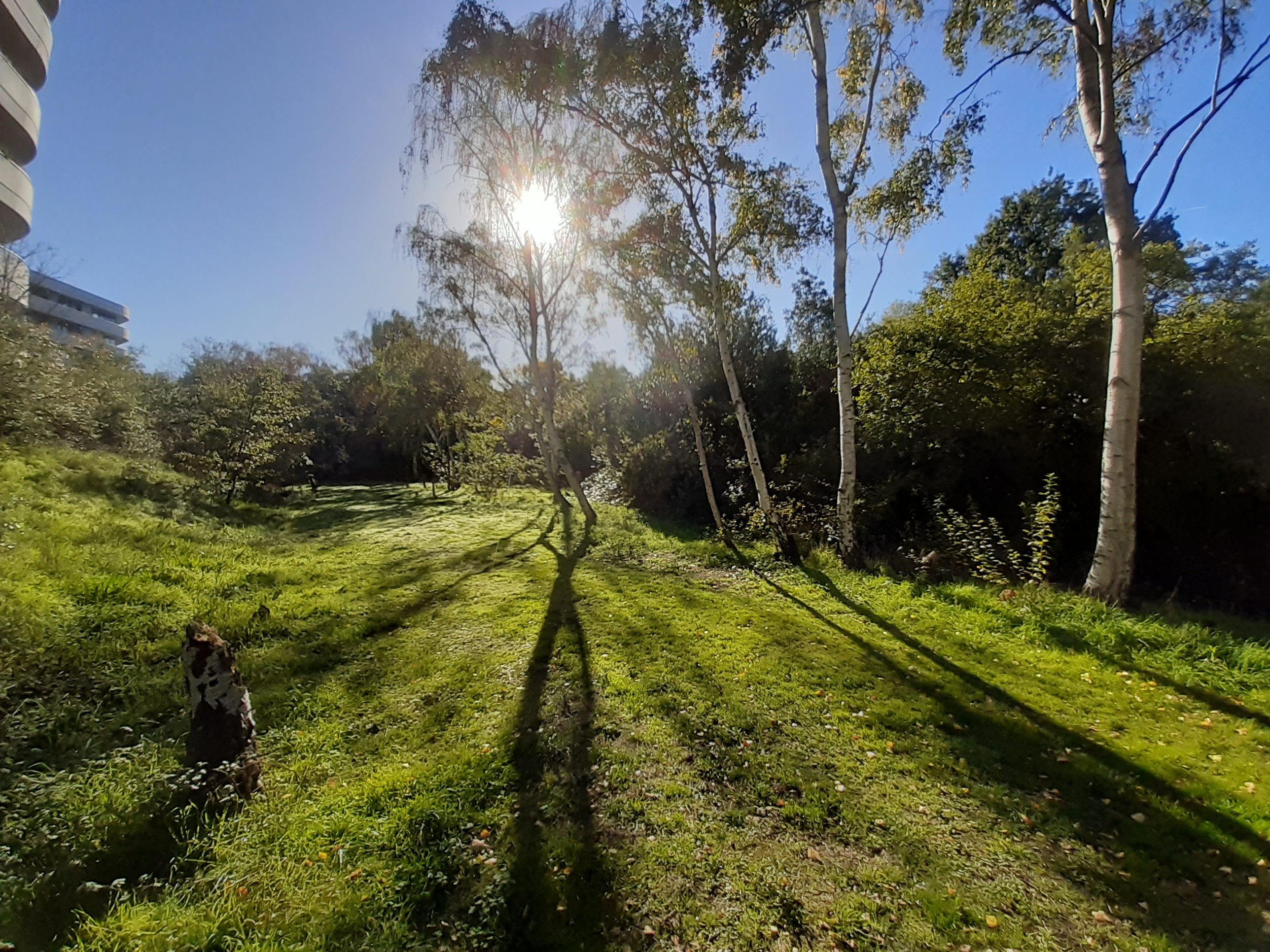
- Acid grassland and birches on old railway track
- Interactive map of Gunnersbury Triangle
- Location: Hounslow/Ealing
- Nearest city: London, England
- Coordinates: 51°29′39″N 0°16′6″W
- Governing body: London Wildlife Trust
- Website: www.wildlondon.org.uk/nature-reserves/gunnersbury-triangle

Gunnersbury Triangle is a 2.57-hectare (6.4-acre) local nature reserve in Chiswick, in the London boroughs of Ealing and Hounslow, immediately to the east of Gunnersbury. It was created in 1983 when, for the first time in Britain, a public inquiry ruled that a planned development of the land could not go ahead because of its value for nature. It opened as a nature reserve in 1985.

The area consists mainly of secondary birch woodland, with some locally uncommon willow carr or wet woodland and a small area of acid grassland along the track of the former Acton curve railway. The reserve supports a varied population of plants, birds, amphibians, insects and other wildlife. It is managed by the London Wildlife Trust.

The reserve is maintained by London Wildlife Trust staff with the help of volunteers, and is open to the public. There is a varied programme of activities including wildlife walks, fungus forays, open days and talks. The reserve is used regularly by school and community groups, and for team-building work days by corporate groups. Its entrance, with a wooden five-bar gate flanked by hedges, is on the south of Bollo Lane, a few yards from Chiswick Park Underground station.

== History ==
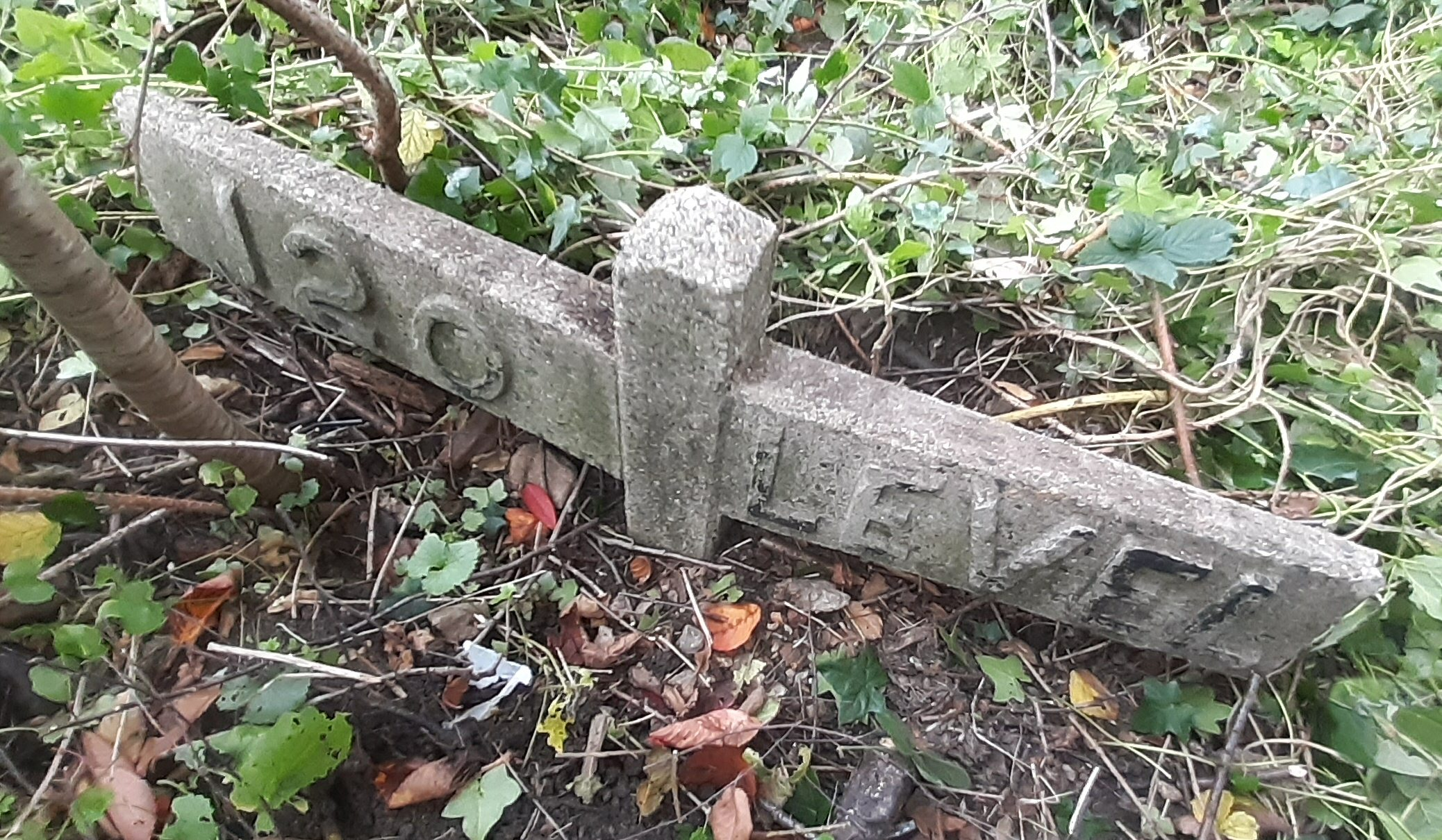
Old railway level indicator beside the former Acton Curve goods track

The area is shown on 19th-century maps as orchards and gravel quarries. The triangular area now occupied by the reserve was delineated by three railway lines, two belonging to the District Railway (now the District line of London Underground), and one to the now-defunct London and South Western Railway (LSWR). There was once a bridge into the triangle from the west, and in the 1940s it was used as railway allotments (vegetable gardens), but when London Transport's Acton Works was built, the bridge was abandoned. The area, thus disused, was colonised naturally by grasses and trees in a "secondary succession".

Gunnersbury Triangle local nature reserve campaign, 1988, showing children by the pond

In 1981, the site was proposed for commercial development, provoking an energetic campaign by the Chiswick Wildlife Group, formed in March 1982, which became the local branch of the London Wildlife Trust. The threat to the site was one of the first to be highlighted by the London Wildlife Trust on its formation in October 1981. The campaign led to a public inquiry in July 1983, which determined that the site should be devoted to nature conservation. This was the first time anywhere in the United Kingdom that a public inquiry had ruled in favour of nature in a city, and the Gunnersbury Triangle example became a test case.

According to the New Scientist, writing in 1985, "the celebrated Gunnersbury Triangle – an undisturbed piece of woodland surrounded by railways including the District Line ... was bought and preserved by Hounslow borough from British Rail with a GLC grant of £58 000. (Note: The land was far from 'undisturbed', being entirely a secondary succession. It was not only woodland but acid grassland and other habitats. It was only partly surrounded by railways. The 'GLC' was the Greater London Council.) The GLC also gave expert ecological advice when Hounslow council contested a public inquiry to save the Triangle."

The London Wildlife Trust has managed the Gunnersbury Triangle on behalf of the London Borough of Hounslow since 1985. The London Borough of Hounslow formally designated the Gunnersbury Triangle as a local nature reserve in 1987. The London Borough of Ealing formally designated the part of the Gunnersbury Triangle that lies in Ealing as a local nature reserve in 1991.

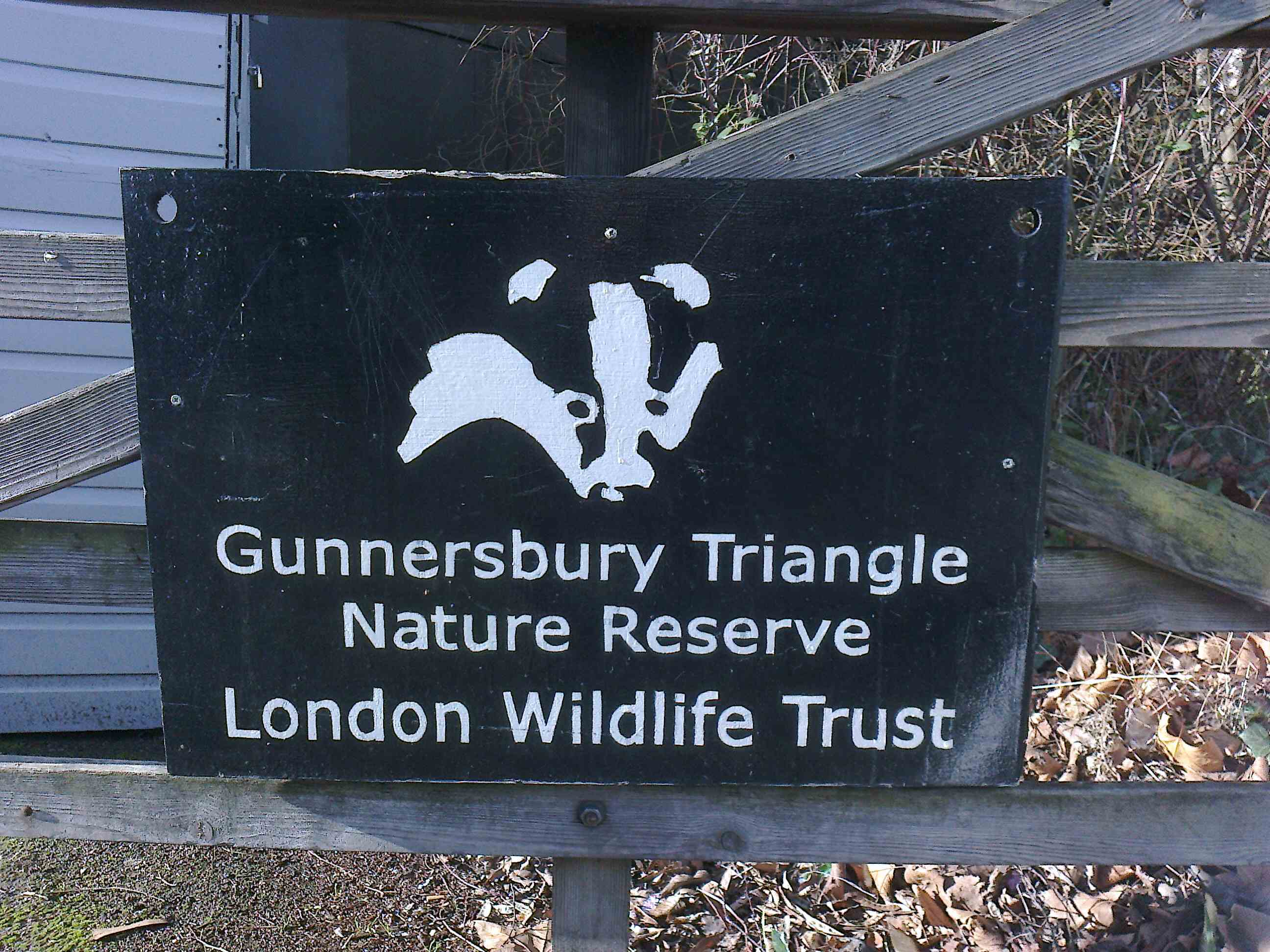
Badger signboard

In 1993, recalling the dramatic events, the president of the London Natural History Society, David Bevan said:

On November 19th 1987,... The Gunnersbury Triangle was declared by Hounslow Council. The circumstances that led up to this important declaration are vividly described in David Goode's book. This was emphatically not a rural site. It was surrounded on all three sides by railway lines and had only been in existence for a mere forty years."

Bevan quoted Goode as saying "It had none of the features which, in traditional nature conservation terms, would make it a place worth preserving", going on to explain this remark as follows:

Nevertheless, the woodland that had grown up on it provided the only genuinely wild place for miles around and it was greatly cherished by local people. British Rail, who owned the site, had applied for planning permission to put up warehousing over the whole of the triangle. This was refused by Hounslow Council and a public inquiry followed in 1983. The Inspector ruled that the development should not be allowed because of the considerable local ecological value.

In 2016, the Triangle's volunteers won an RE:LEAF Acorn Award for their "particular contribution to promoting or conserving trees".

In 2018, EcoWorld London and Lampton 360 (for the London Borough of Hounslow) announced plans for a new visitor centre, to be positioned in a new block of 9 flats at the reserve's entrance. In 2019, both Hounslow and Ealing councils declared the reserve to be an "Asset of Community Value".

== Reserve ==
Gunnersbury Triangle sketch map

Gunnersbury Triangle is a classic "railway triangle", the 2.57-hectare (6.4-acre) space in between three curving railway lines. To the west is the Richmond branch of the London Overground; to the south, the District line; and to the northeast, the disused track of the London and South Western Railway (there remains the Piccadilly line a little further north, crossing Bollo lane). Much of the area is now wooded. It is a local nature reserve and a Site of Metropolitan Importance for Nature Conservation. Traces of its former uses survive in the shape of railway archaeology and garden species such as raspberry and redcurrant from the railwaymen's gardens.

== Habitats ==
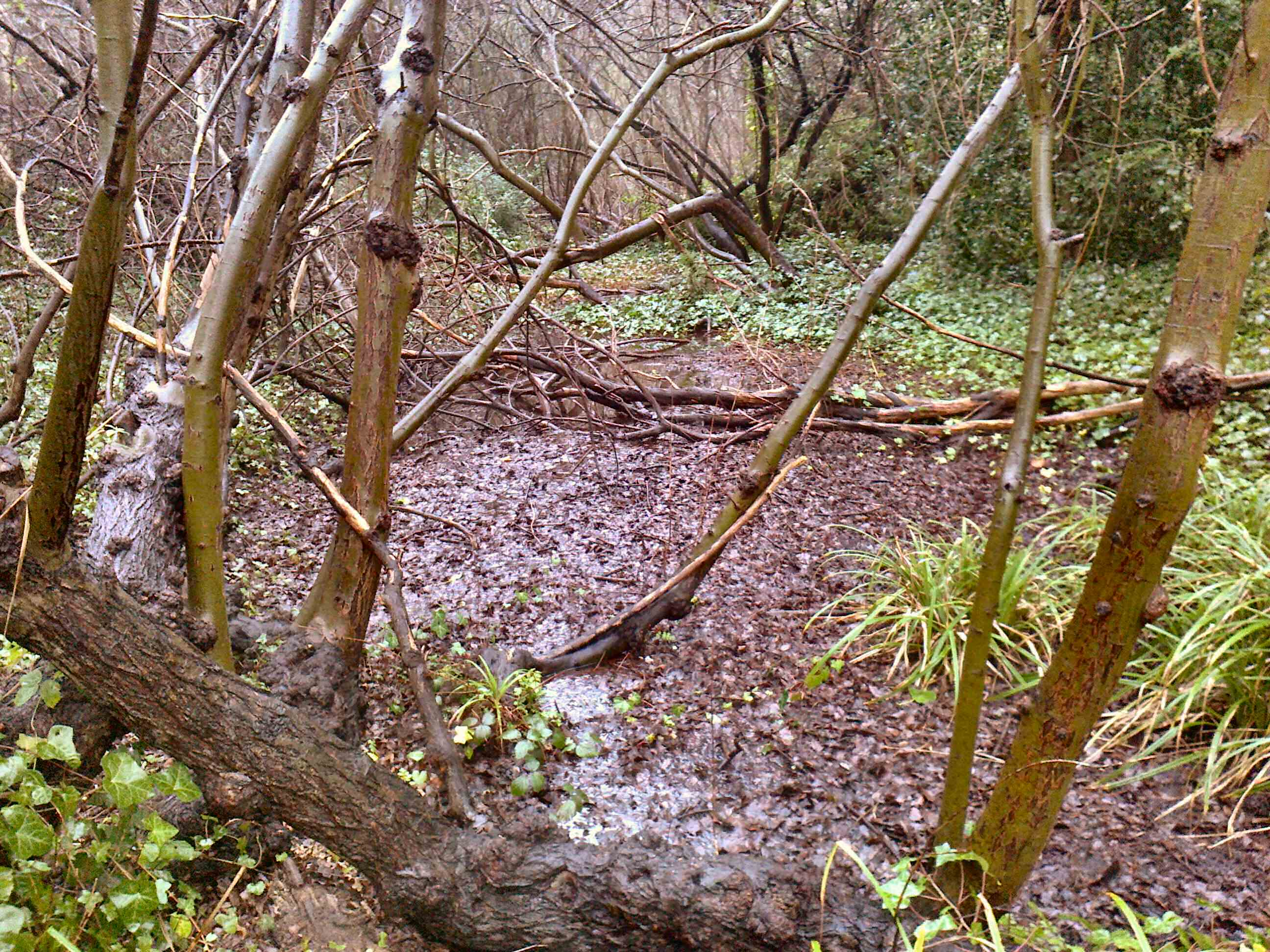
The wet woodland "Mangrove Swamp" with willows

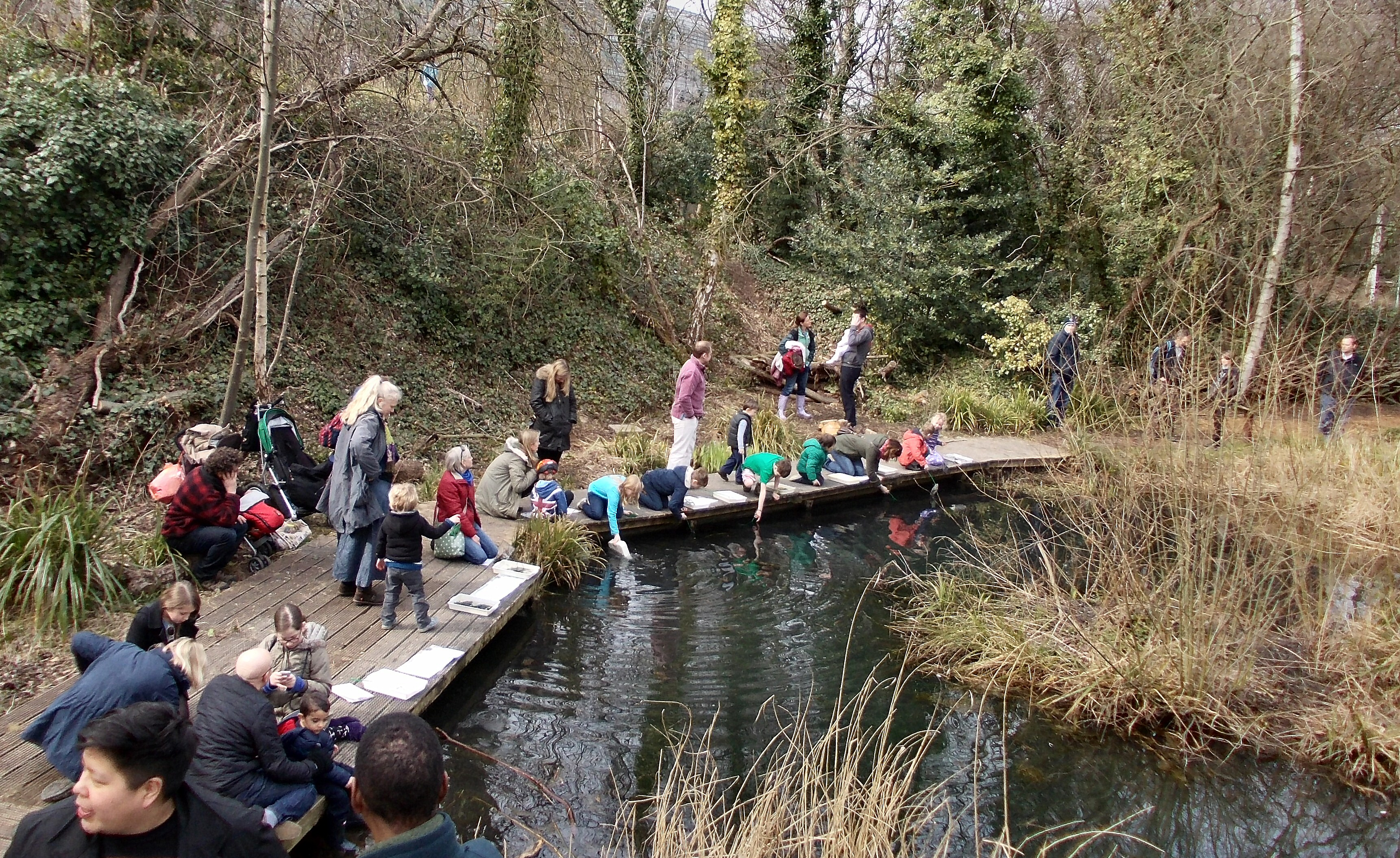
Pond dippers on Frog Day

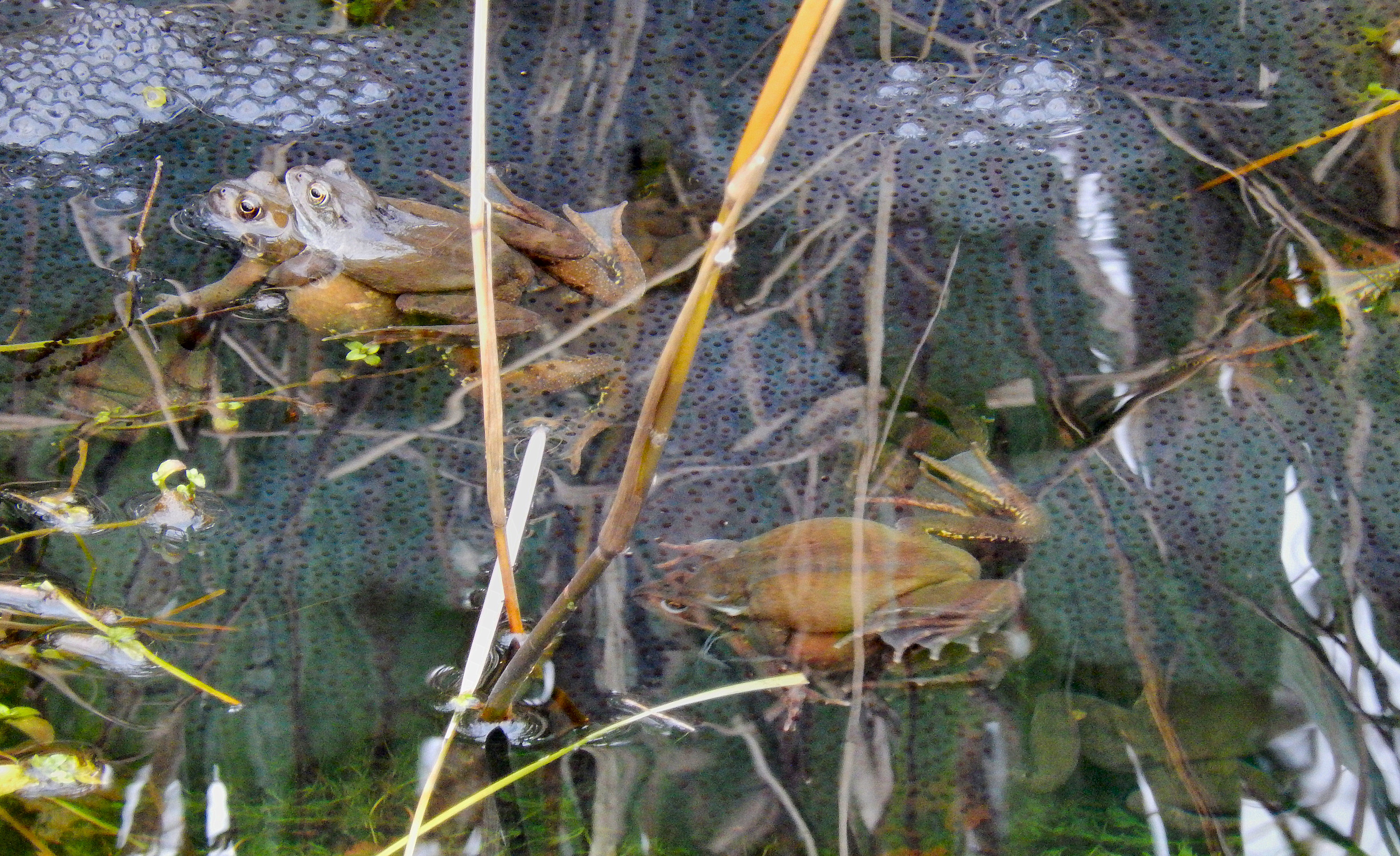
Six frogs spawning in the main pond

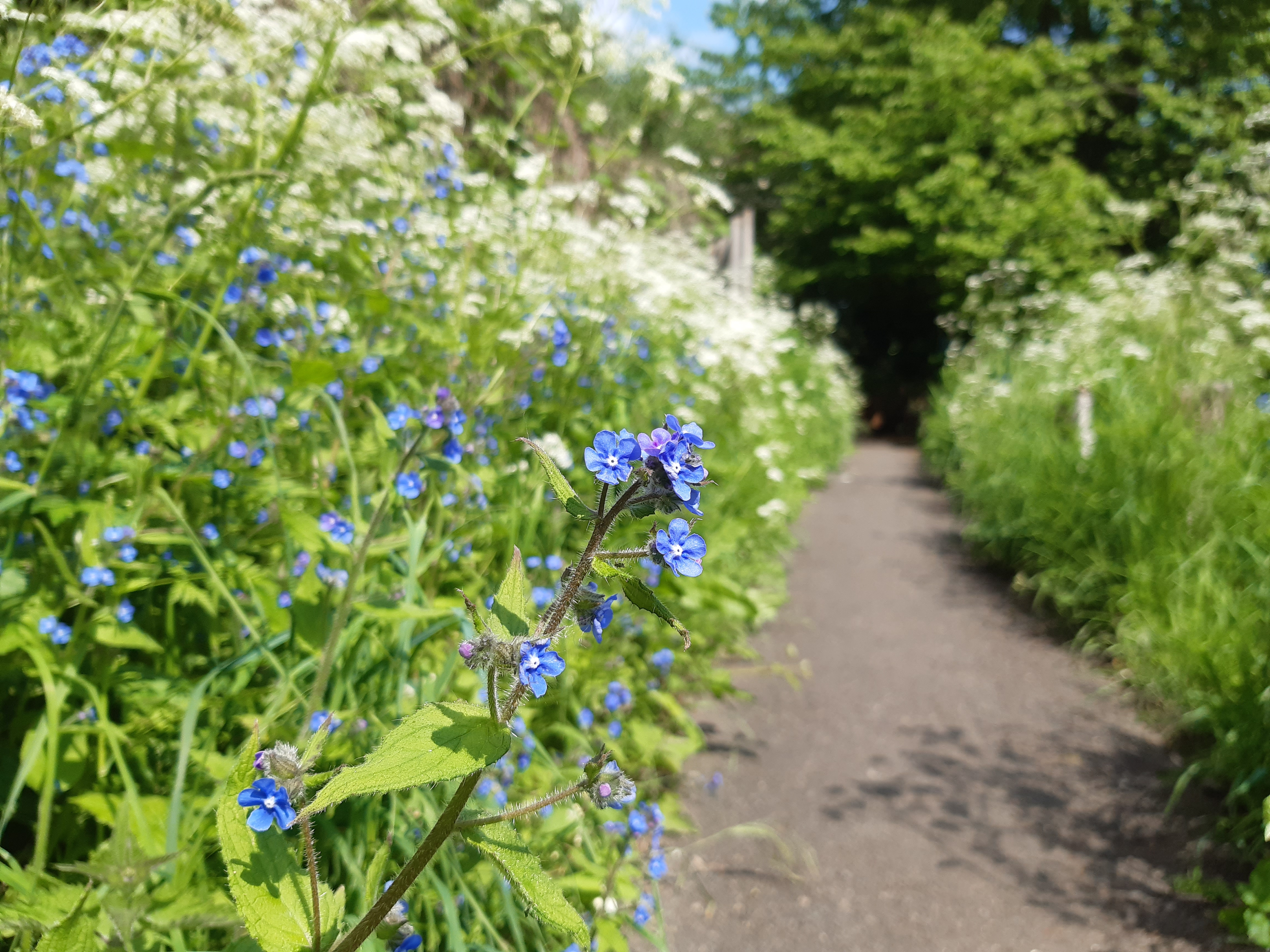
The entrance ramp in springtime, with alkanet and cow parsley

The following compartments are identified in the reserve's management plan:

- Compartment 1: Secondary birch woodland

This covers most of the reserve. Silver birch is dominant, with a few crack willow, goat willow, some wild cherry and sycamore in the canopy. Shrubs include hawthorn, elder, holly, yew and rowan, with garden escapes like buddleia, Oregon grape, cotoneaster, privet. There are some saplings of pedunculate oak, mostly around the edge, and holm oak. The field layer is mainly thick bramble, with ivy in denser shade. Ferns include male fern, broad buckler fern and the less common lady fern.

- Compartment 2: Secondary willow woodland

Willow carr (locally uncommon wet woodland including the "mangrove swamp") with goat willow, grey willow, and some crack willow, with hybrids. The shrubs and field layer are similar to compartment 1; there is some honeysuckle and common horsetail, hemlock water-dropwort, gypsywort, yellow flag, pendulous sedge.

- Compartment 3: Eastern bank and hedgerow

Rough grassland with false oat-grass, Yorkshire fog, yarrow, cat's ear, with bracken at the south end. There is an uneven hedge of hawthorn and buckthorn. The sunny south-west aspect encourages butterflies including holly blue, Essex skipper and small skipper.

- Compartment 4: North neutral meadow (anthill meadow)

Very uneven meadow with mounds formed by the yellow meadow ant Lasius flavus, fox earths, and spoil dumped during former gravel works. Grasses especially false oat-grass, Yorkshire fog; also cock's-foot, common bent and sheep's fescue. Herbs include common vetch, meadow vetchling, white clover, yarrow, ribwort plantain.

- Compartment 5: North acid meadow (railway track acid grassland)

On the former Acton curve railway, with a substratum of gritty sand and ballast (hard acidic rock). Small fine grasses especially sheep's fescue, with fine-leaved sheep's fescue, hard fescue, squirrel-tail fescue, early hair-grass. Herbs include sheep's sorrel, mouse-eared hawkweed, cat's ear and yarrow.

- Compartment 6: Southwest meadow (picnic meadow)

Coarse grasses such as cocksfoot, Yorkshire fog, false oat-grass, annual meadow-grass. Broom has colonised on the site of an accidental fire.

- Compartment 7: Main pond

Main pond, dug in 1986, with seasonally fluctuating water levels. Most vegetation has colonised naturally, with among others common reed, purple loosestrife, yellow iris, water-plantain, water figwort, soft rush, gypsywort, water starwort, curled pondweed, common duckweed, water forget-me-not, water mint, brooklime.

- Compartment 8: Small pond

Seasonal pond with water plantain, celery-leaved crowfoot, bittersweet, water figwort, and introduced yellow iris.

- Compartment 9: Tall herb meadow (beside ramp path from entrance)

Small meadow of tall ruderal herbs, changing with natural succession, held back by cutting, with plants such as cow parsley, hogweed, stinging nettle, false oat-grass, garden escape daffodils and irises.

- Compartment 10: Gardens

Entrance yard gardens sown with wild flowers; hedge mustard, hoary mustard and other ruderal species invading; hedges with native trees and shrubs; hops scramble up the hedges.

- Compartment 11: Infrastructure

Hut, sheds.

== Usage ==
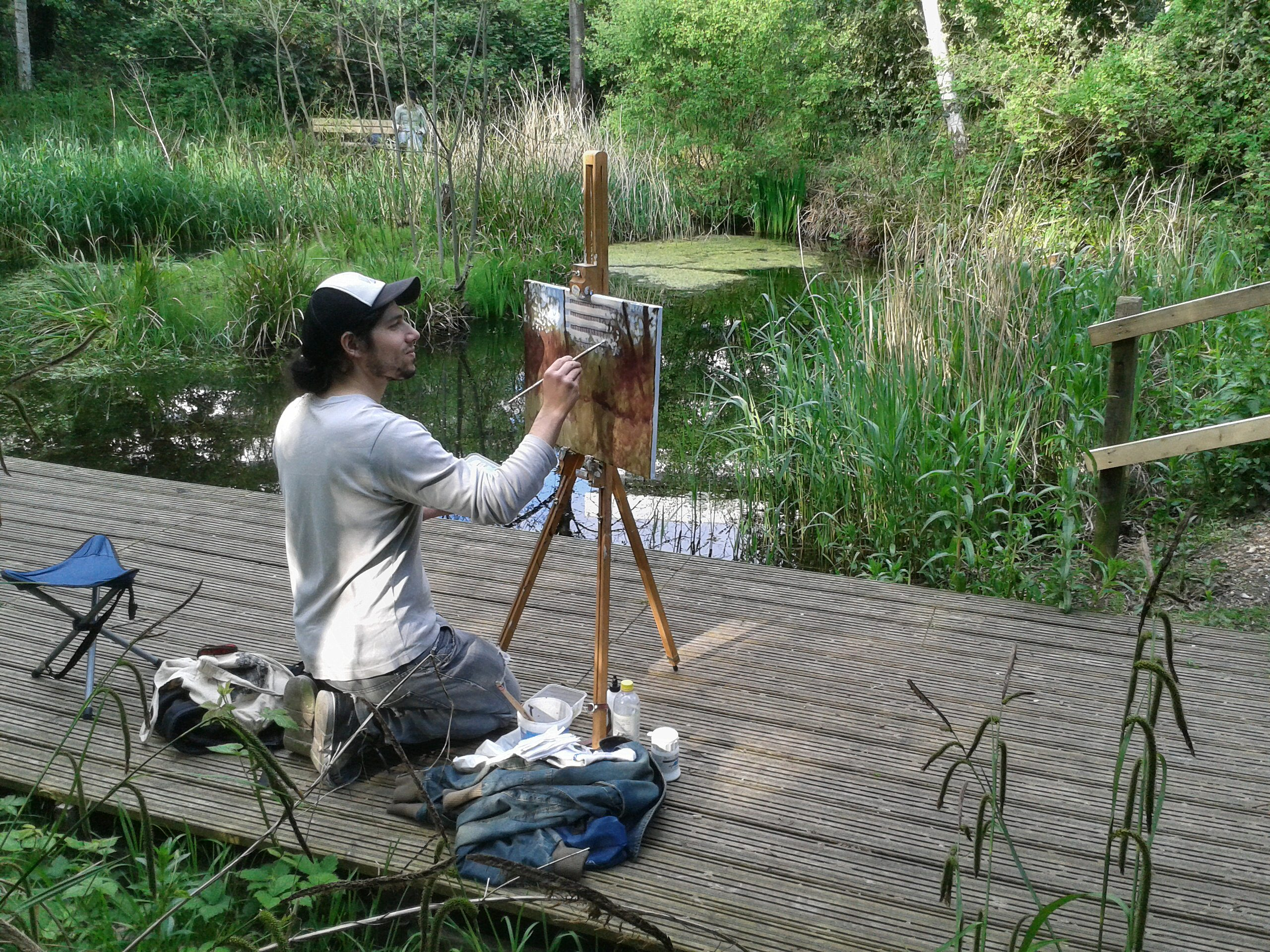
A painter at work on the boardwalk over the pond

The Gunnersbury Triangle is regularly visited by school parties, totalling some 1500 students per year, mainly in the summer when they can work outside. They study grassland, woodland and pond ecology.

According to the TES magazine, "From April, holly blue, peacock and brimstone butterflies abound. Following the illustrated guide, you wind among wild cherry and rowan, under archways of hazel branches to a pond where damsel-flies dance in early summer. A sparrow-hawk nests in a silver birch, a jay comes visiting, bees and wood-mice also live here." The TES continues: "There are open glades for picnics and, in autumn, blackberries to gather. The aim here is to manage the woodland as a natural piece of countryside in town, and if, from time to time, you glimpse a tube train, you hardly notice it, beyond the trees."

The reserve is open to the public. The London Wildlife Trust runs guided visits such as Fungus Forays and wildlife walks every year. On open days, staff and volunteers organise activities to enable children and adults to learn more about nature conservation in a relaxed environment.

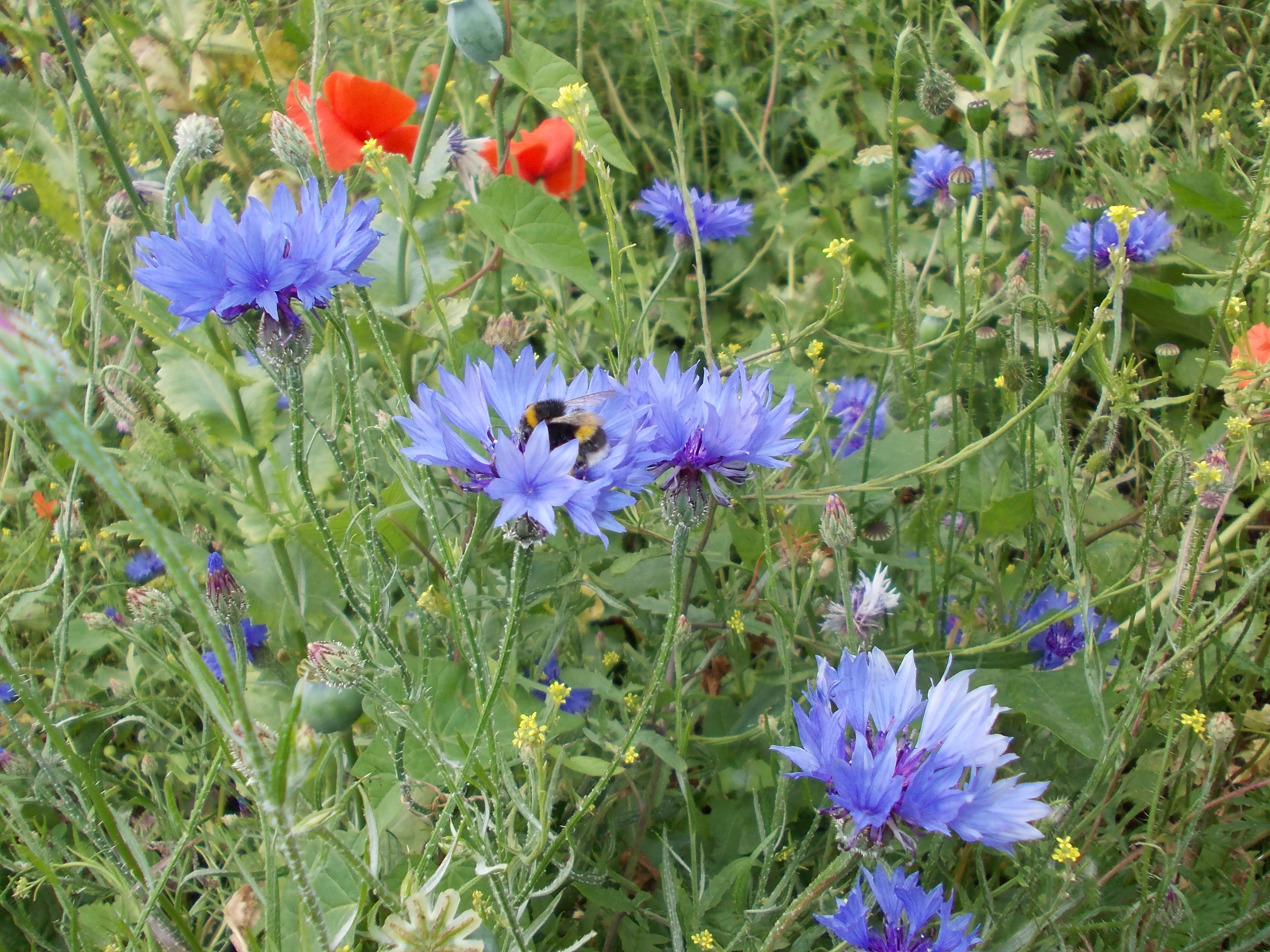
Bumblebee in Gunnersbury Triangle's wildflower demonstration meadow planted with cornflowers and poppies

From time to time, companies provide teams of volunteers to work for a day on tasks such as clearing scrub and repairing paths and fences.

The London Wildlife Trust's long-term management objective for the site is "to manage the nature reserve to conserve its natural biodiversity, and to conserve its matrix of woodland, wetland and grassland habitats through appropriate management". This includes coppicing, clearing scrub, mowing, and controlling invasion by non-native species, while "preserving the feeling of 'wilderness'". Much of the work is carried out by the Trust's volunteers; the trust provides volunteers with training in the more specialised skills such hedgelaying and tree pruning.

== Value ==
The Mayor of London's 2002 Biodiversity Strategy comments "Over the last few decades, many exciting places have been established where city people are able to enjoy the natural world, often on sites which at the outset had seemingly little to offer. These include Camley Street Natural Park in King's Cross, Gillespie Park in Highbury, Gunnersbury Triangle in Chiswick, ..." and explains "The important message conveyed by these projects, regardless of their size, is that significant achievements for nature conservation are possible even in the most urban of settings, and often on modest budgets, provided there exists a cocktail of goodwill, optimism, commitment and professional back-up. Moreover such projects often yield social benefits, providing a community focus."

=== Biodiversity ===
These photographs, all taken in the Gunnersbury Triangle nature reserve, illustrate a little of its biodiversity.

==== Animals ====
Vertebrates
Vertebrates

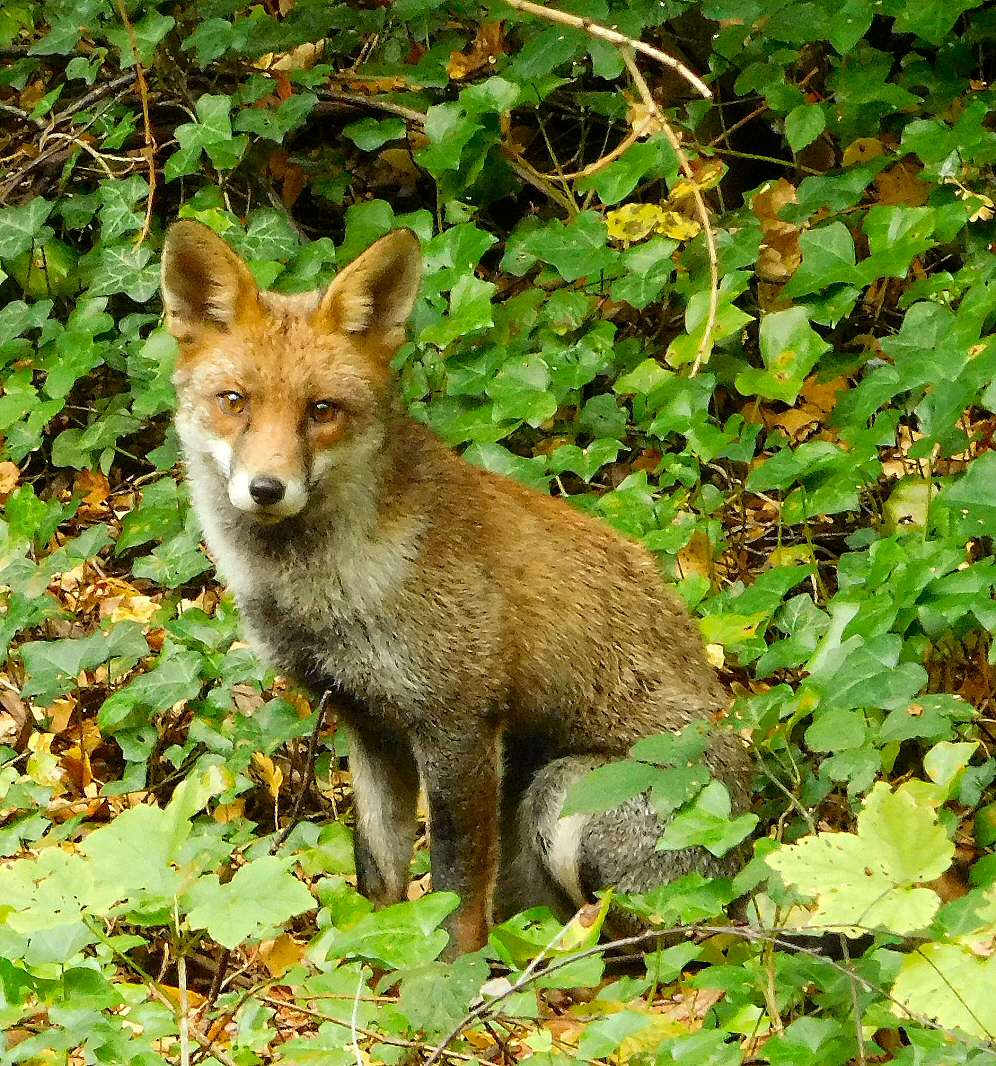
Fox, Vulpes vulpes

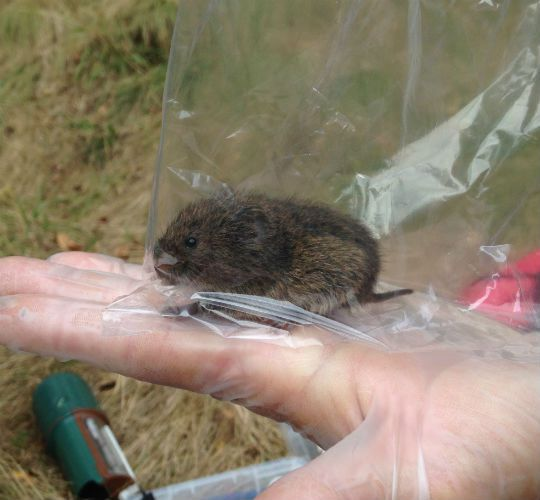
Bank vole, Myodes glareolus, in capture-release population study

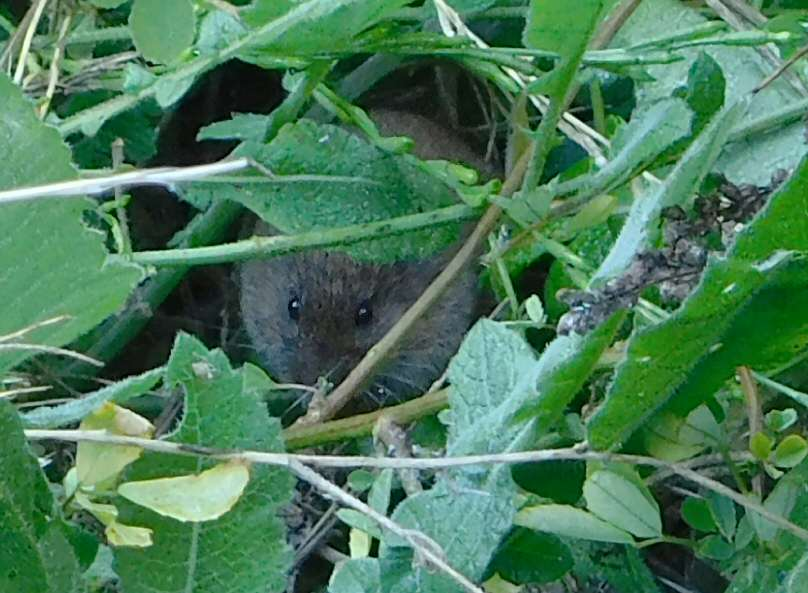
Bank vole eating mugwort seeds (Artemisia vulgaris)

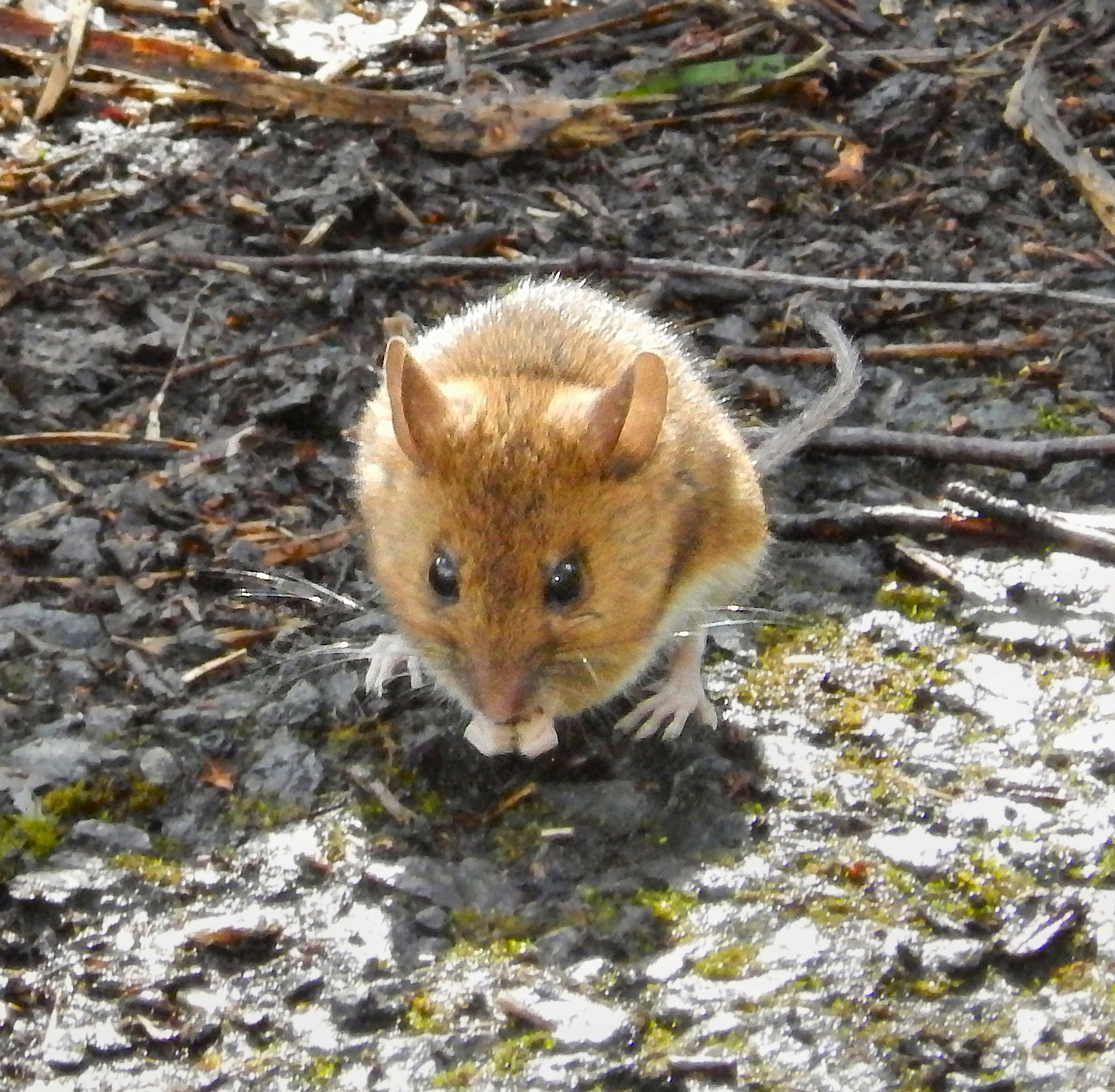
Wood mouse, Apodemus sylvaticus

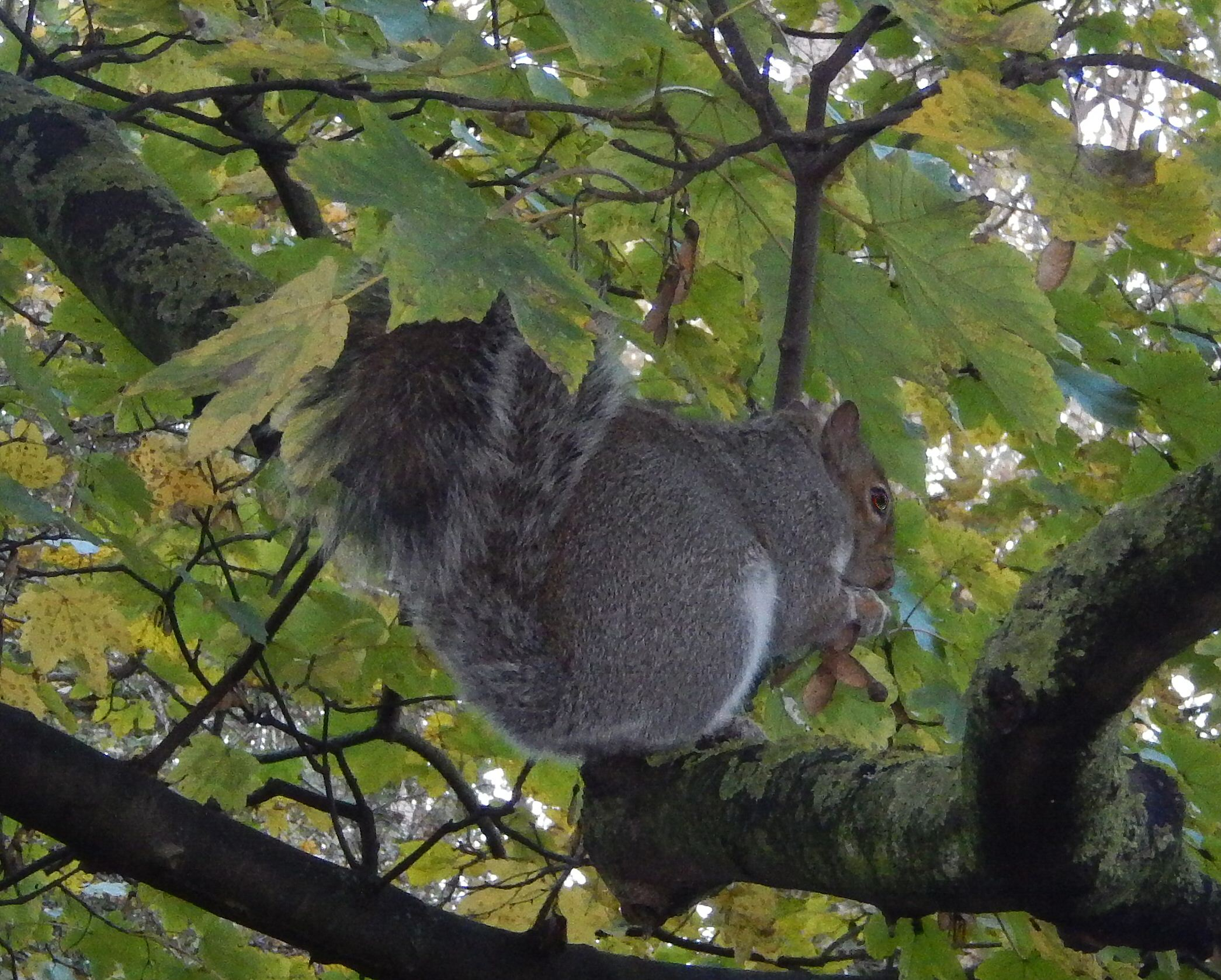
Grey squirrel, Sciurus carolinensis, with sycamore fruits

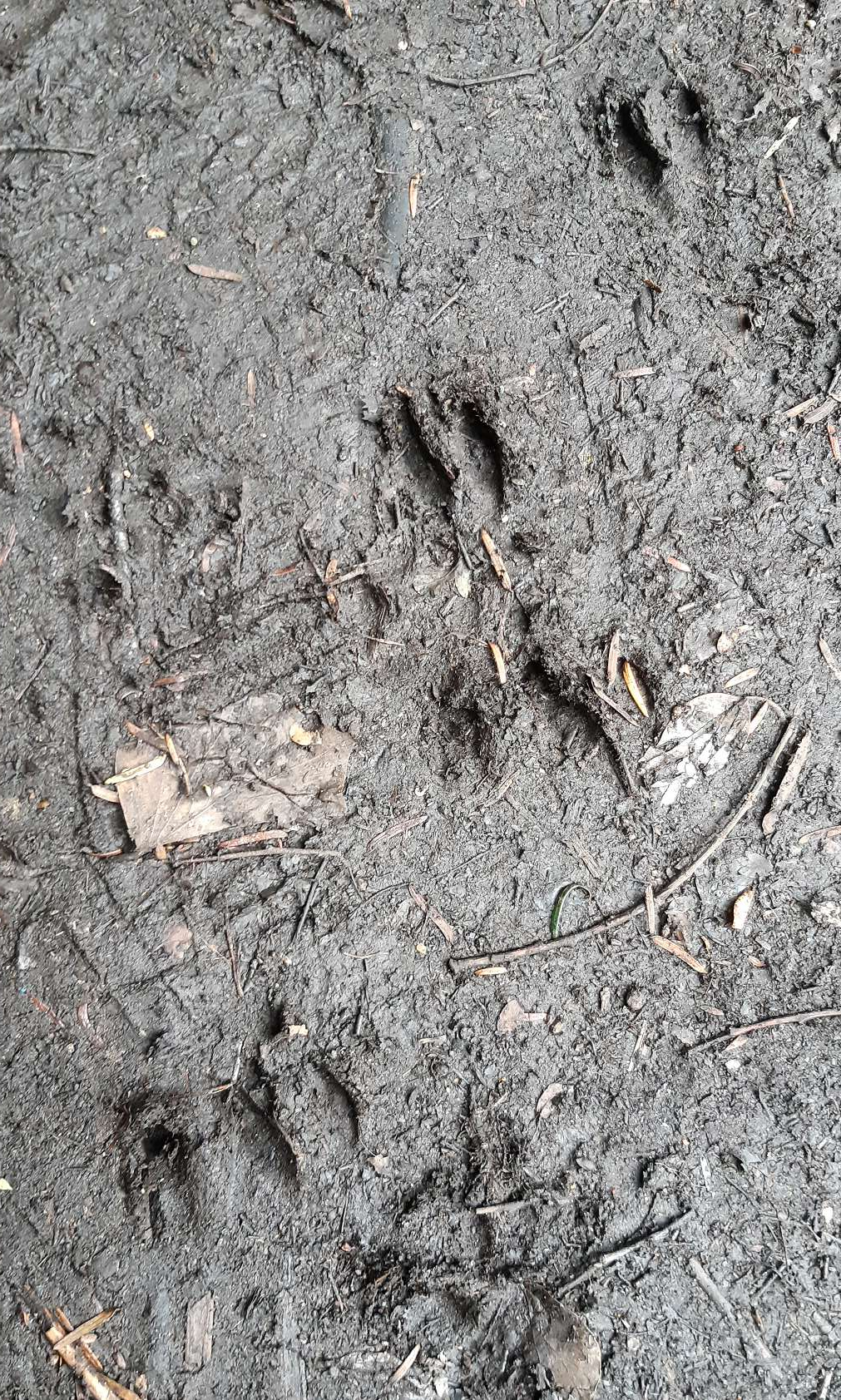
Muntjac (Muntiacus reevesi) prints in soft earth

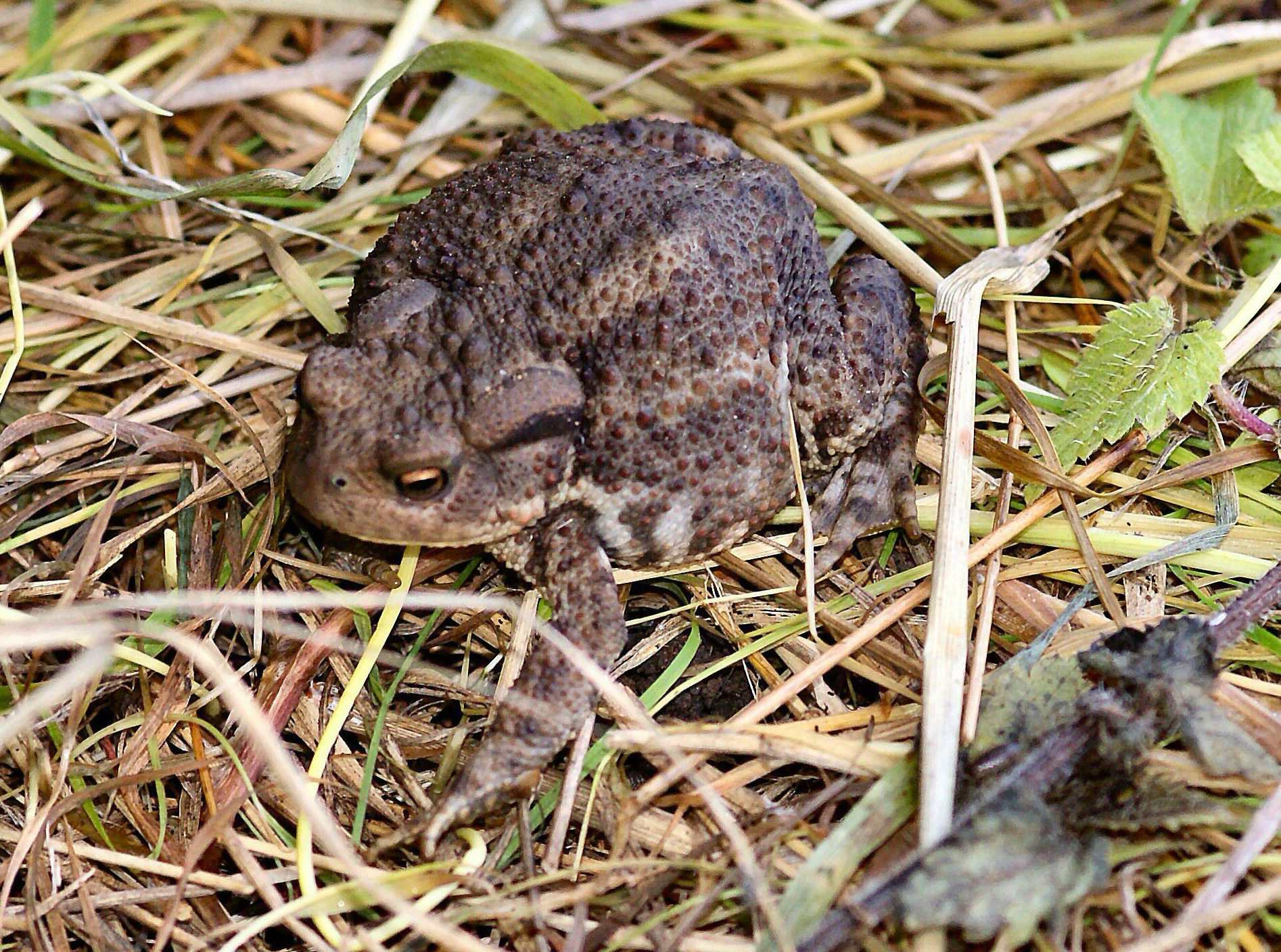
Toad, Bufo bufo

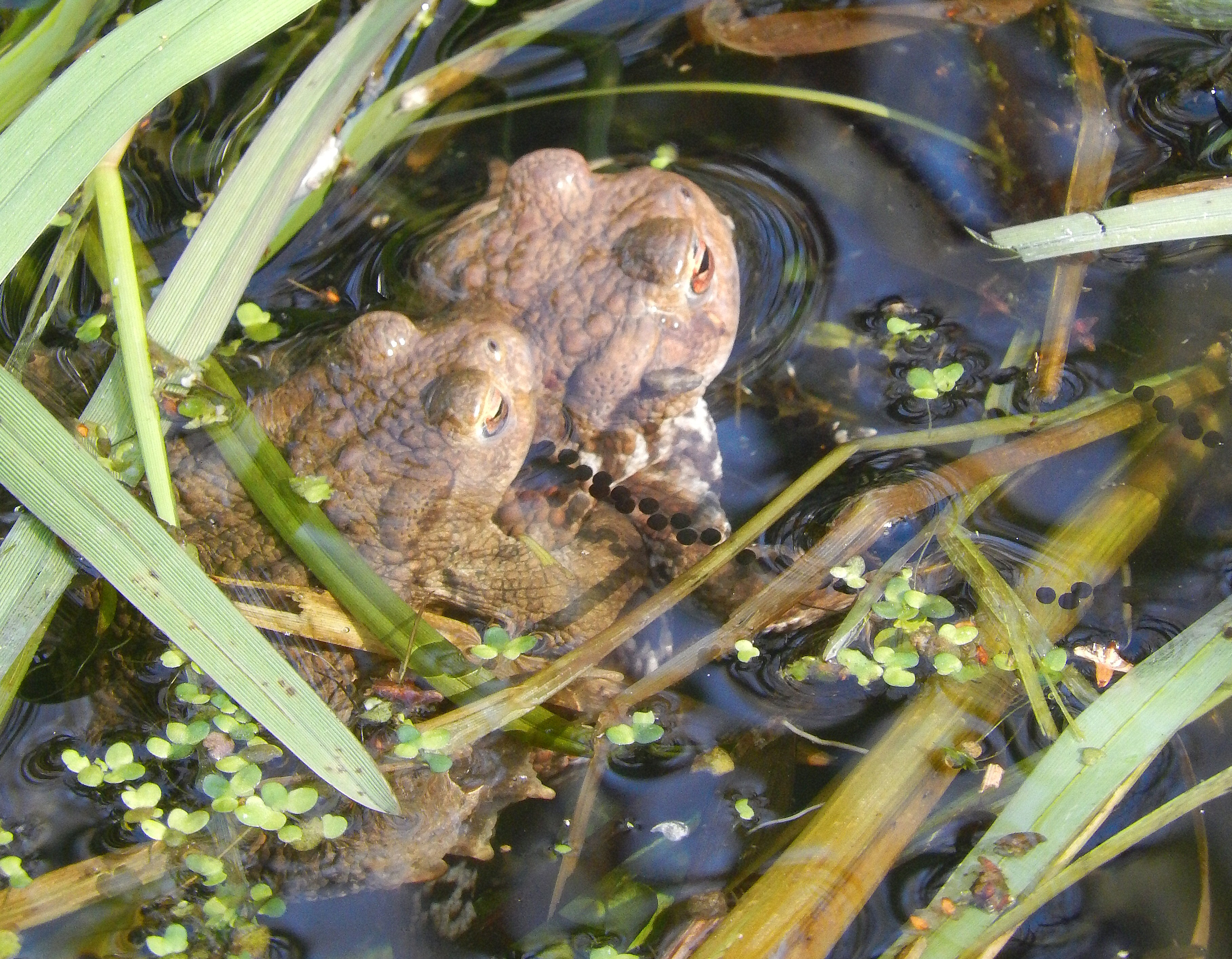
Toads in amplexus with strings of toadspawn

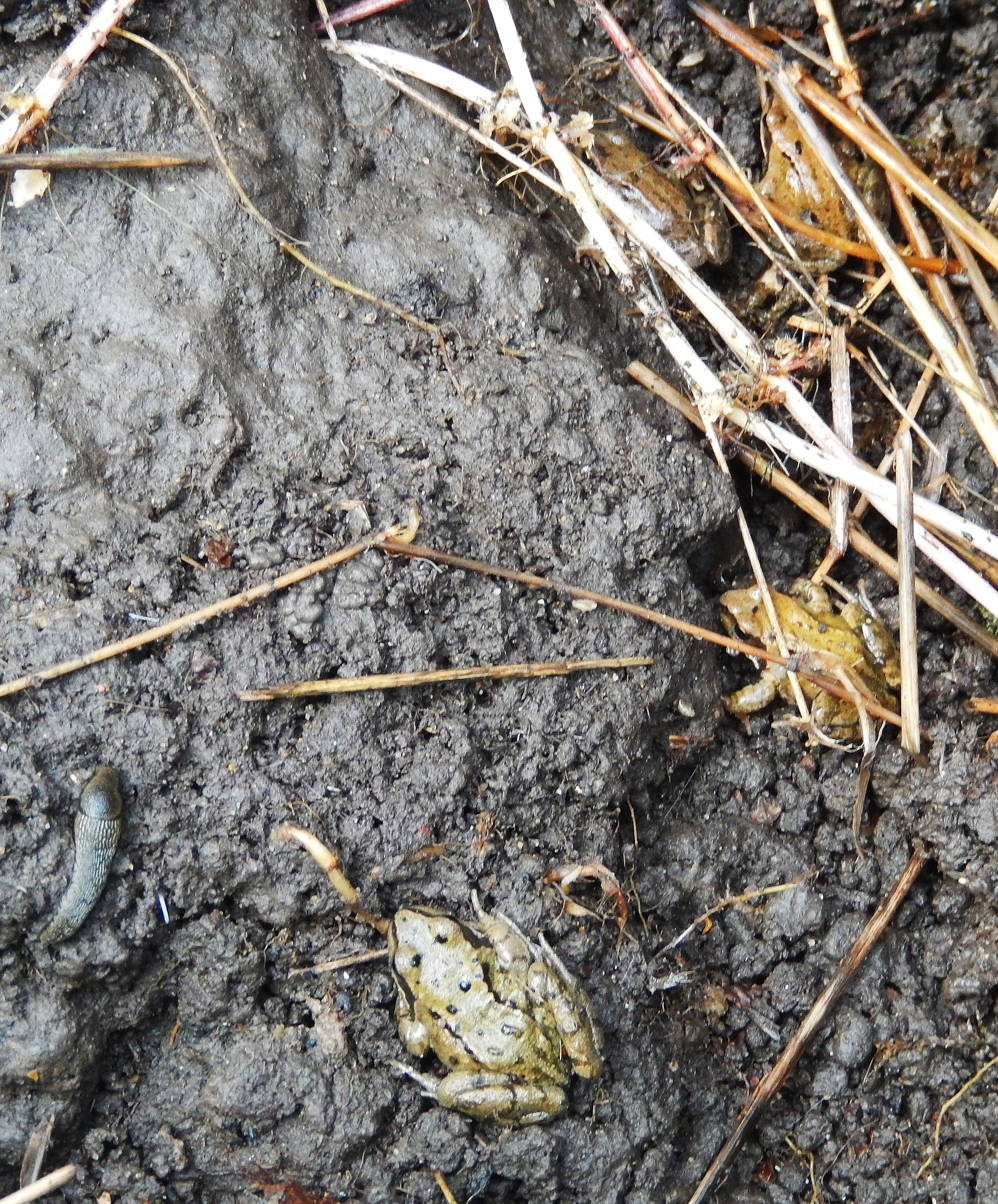
Common frogs, Rana temporaria, wintering under a habitat mat

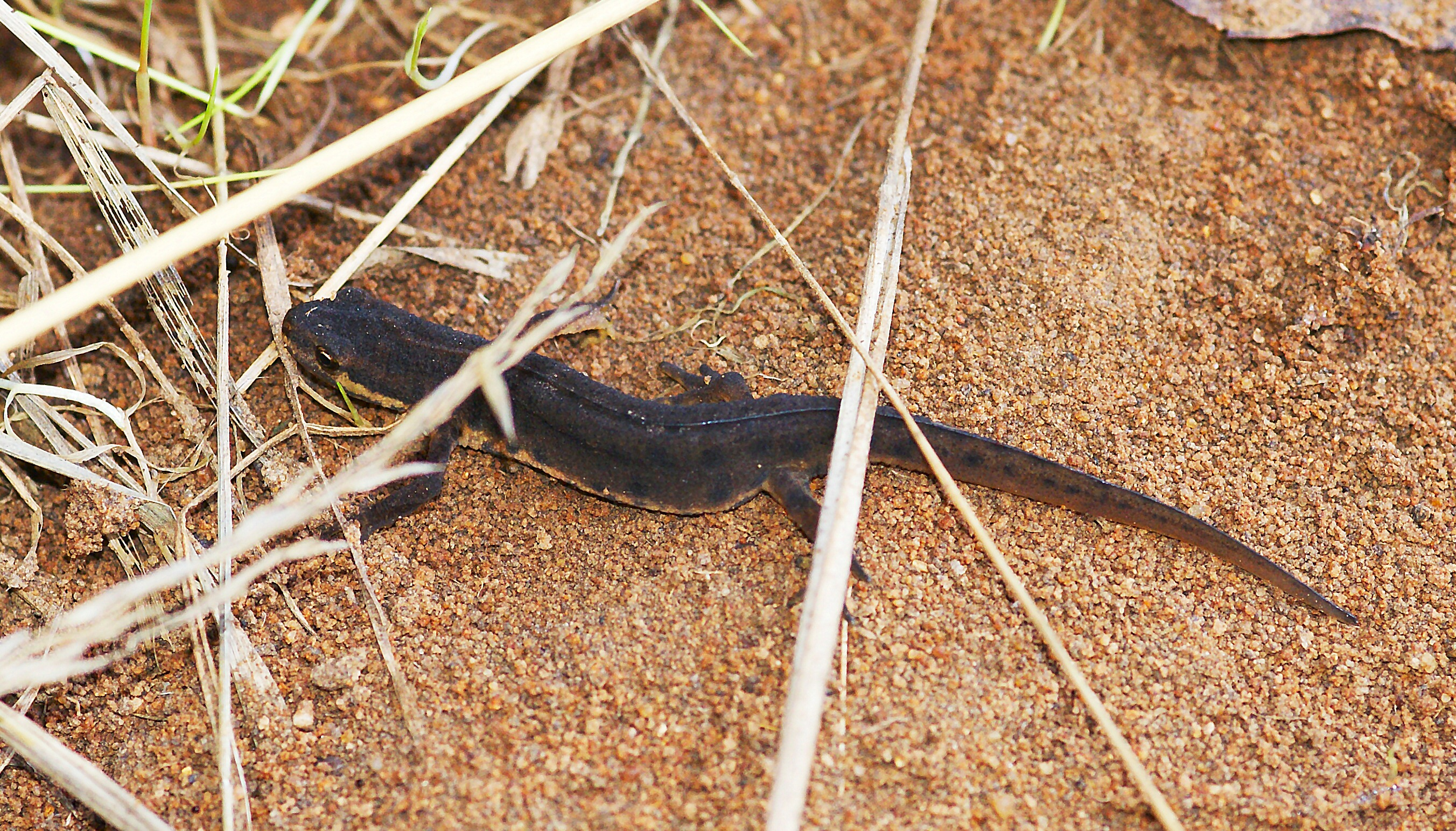
Smooth newt, Lissotriton vulgaris

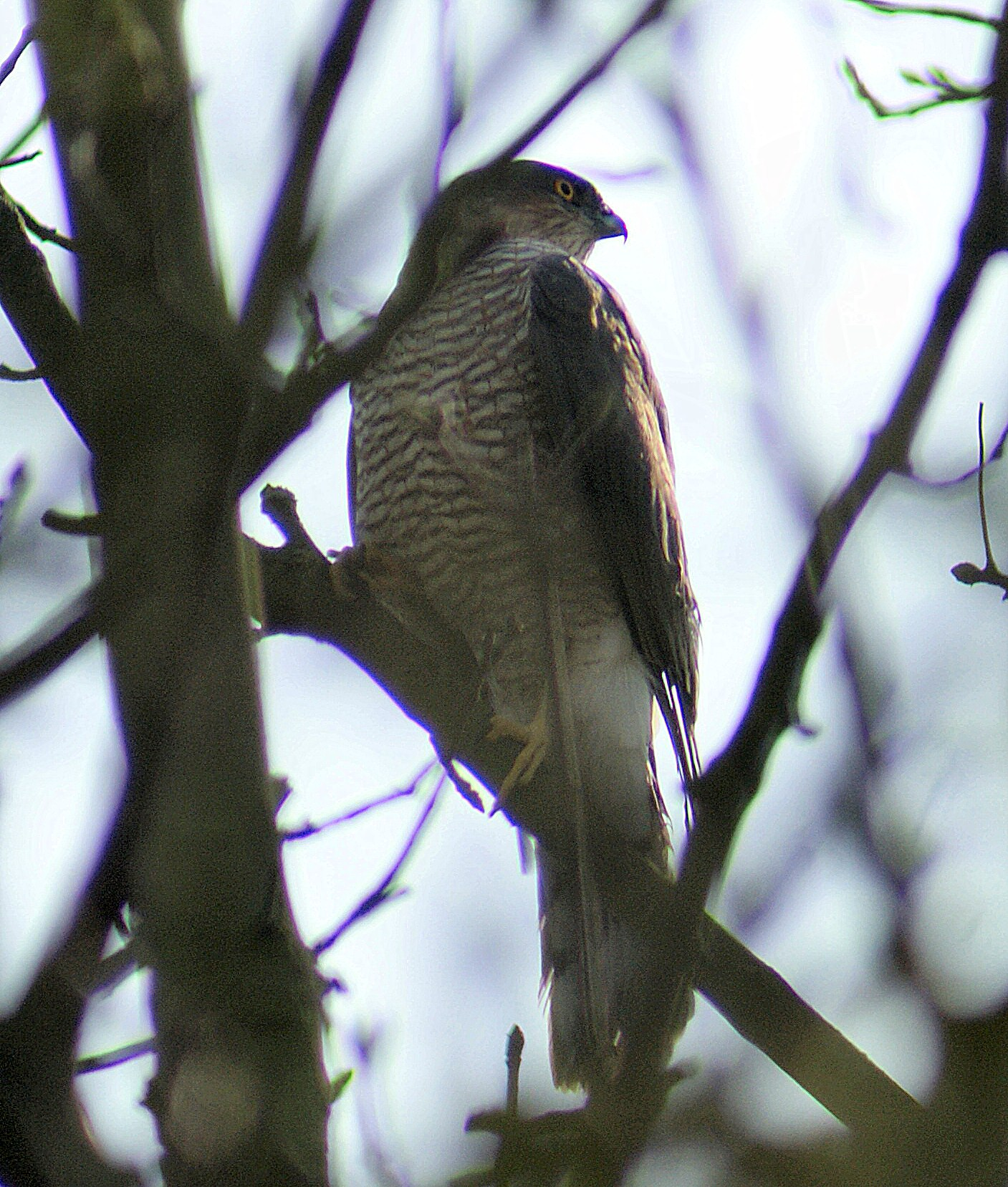
Sparrowhawk, Accipiter nisus

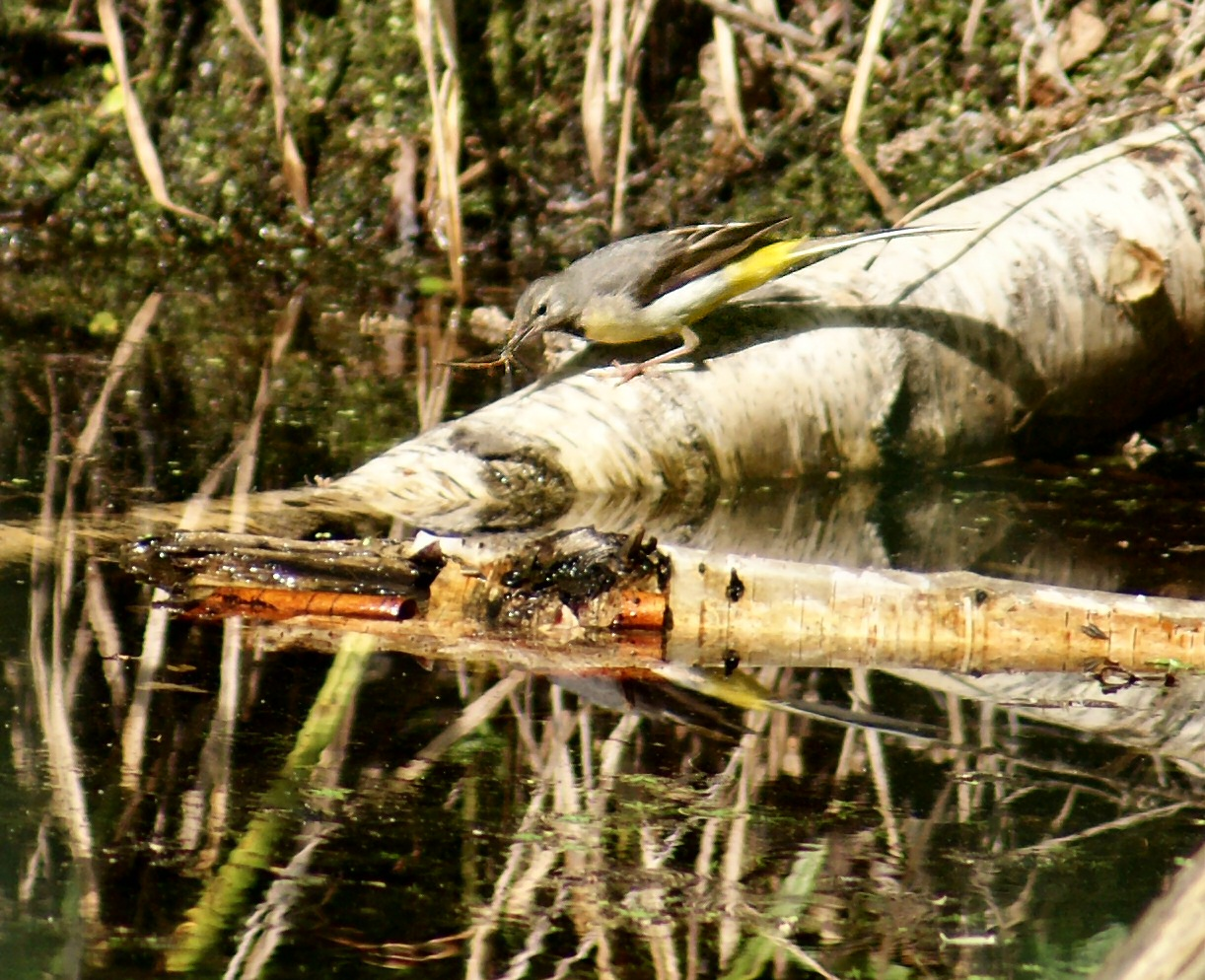
Grey wagtail, Motacilla cinerea

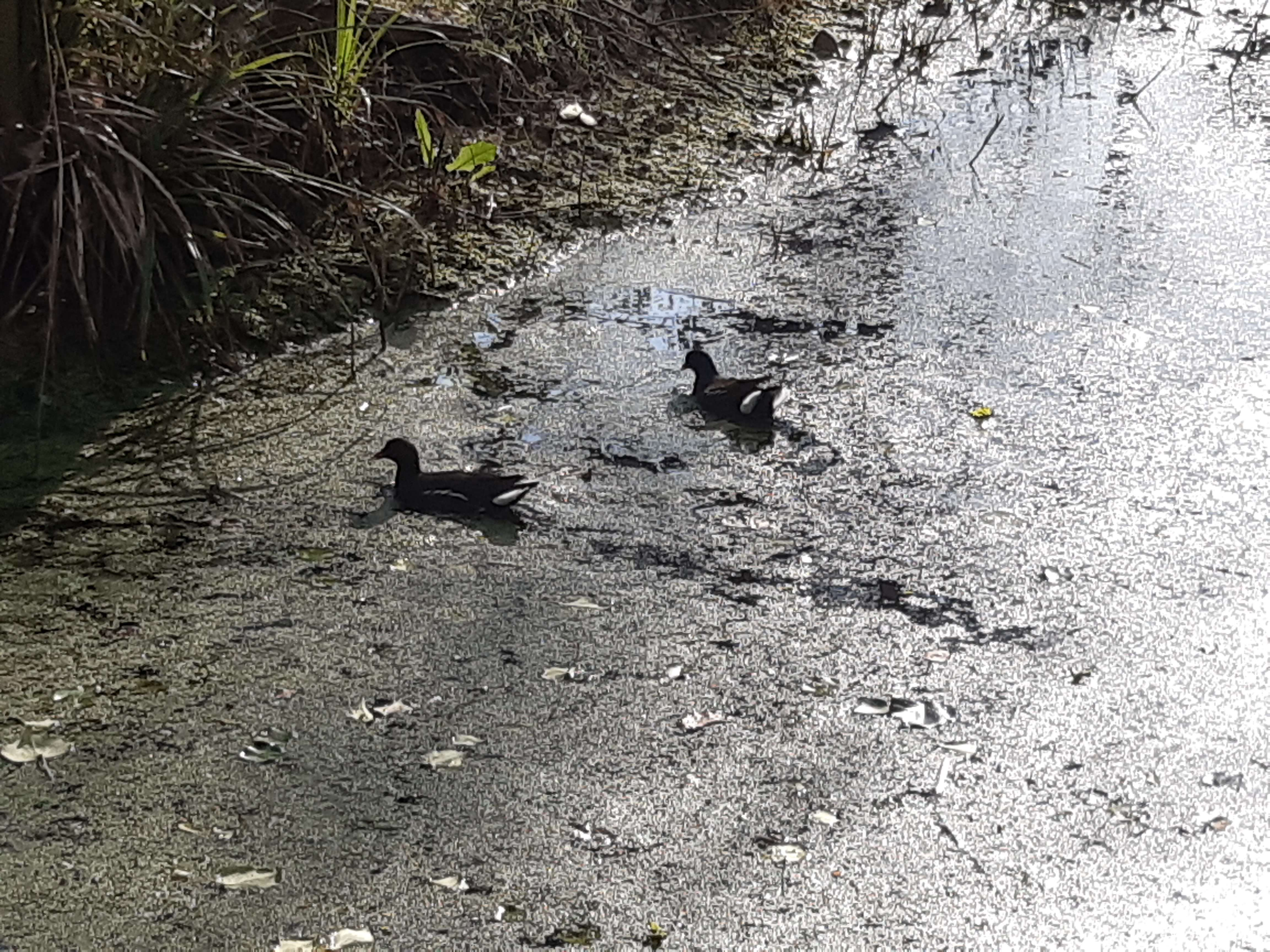
A pair of moorhens on the pond

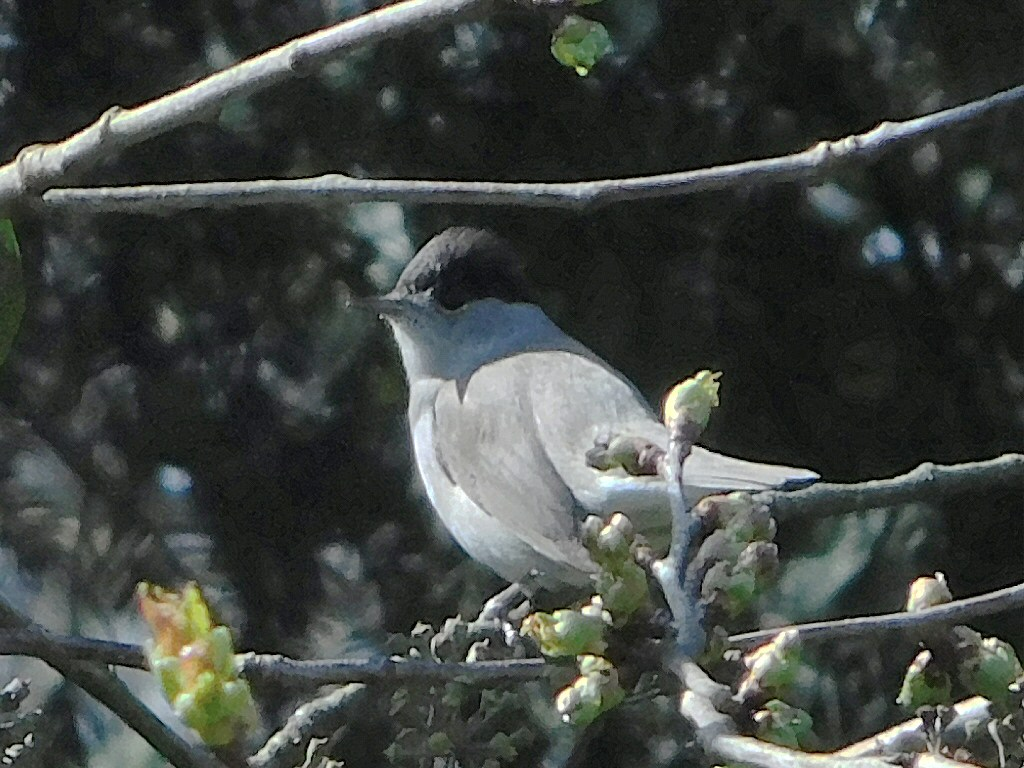
Blackcap, Sylvia atricapilla singing

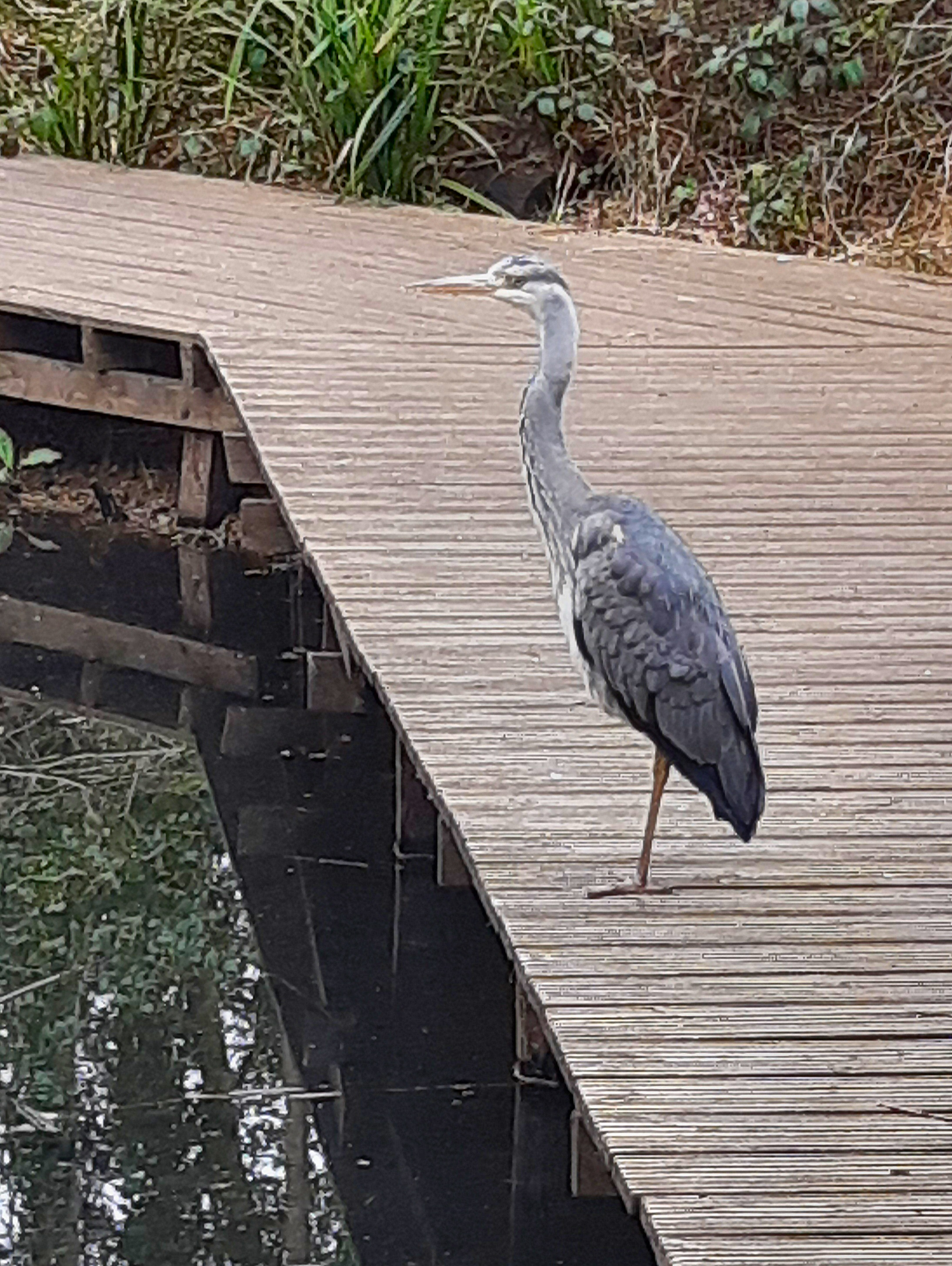
Grey heron, Ardea cinerea on boardwalk

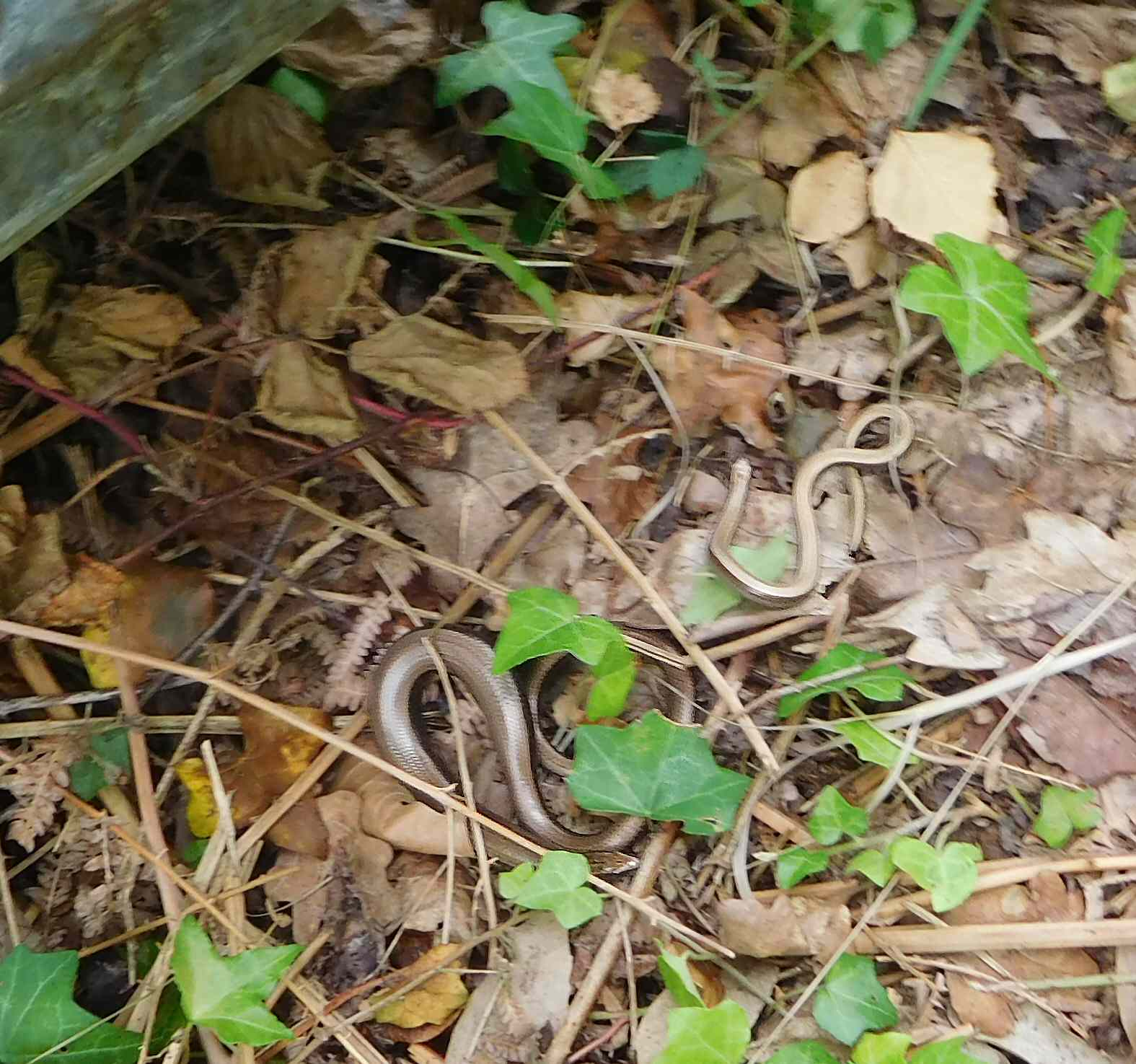
An adult and a young slowworm, Anguis fragilis

Butterflies and moths
Butterflies and moths

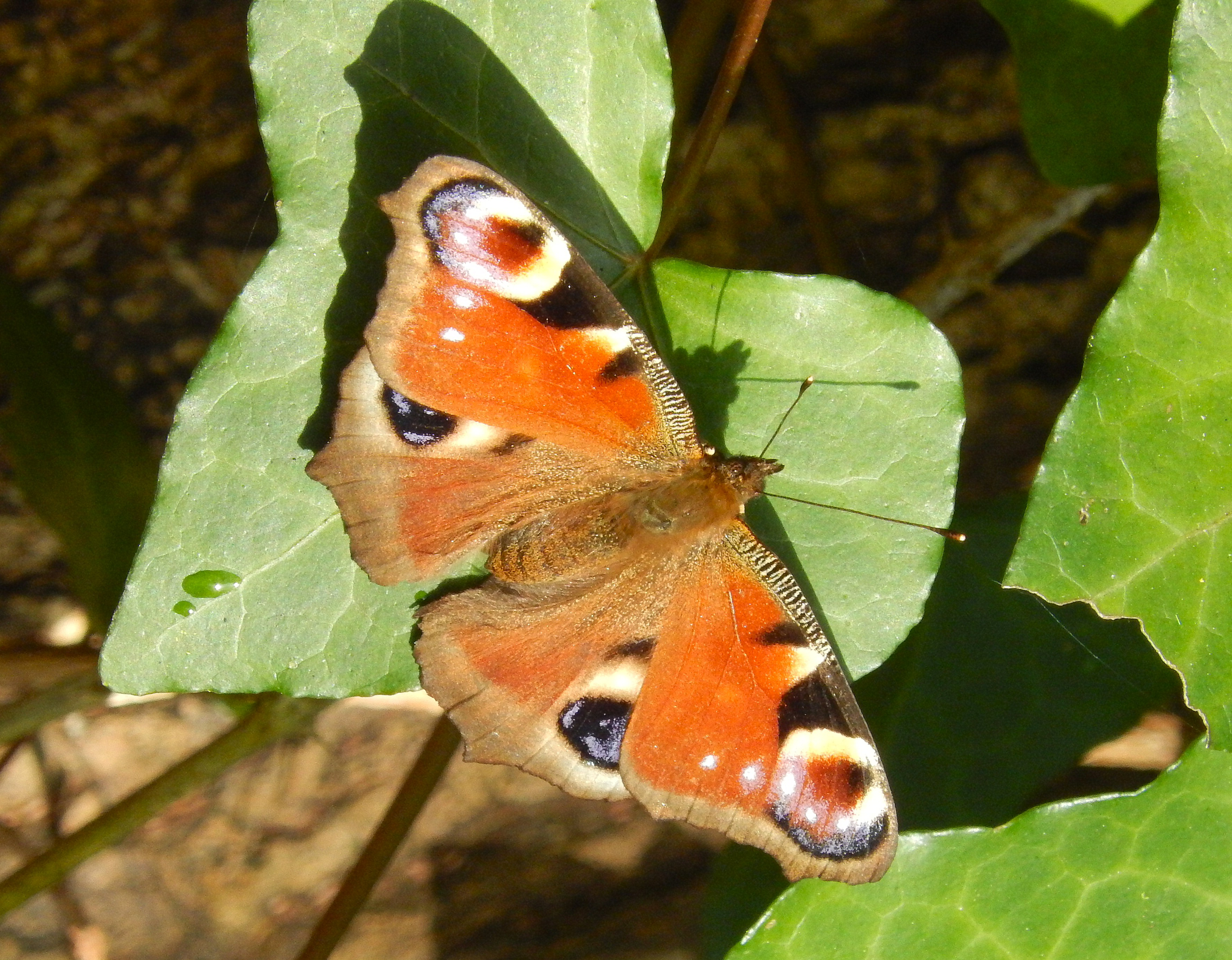
Peacock butterfly, Aglais io

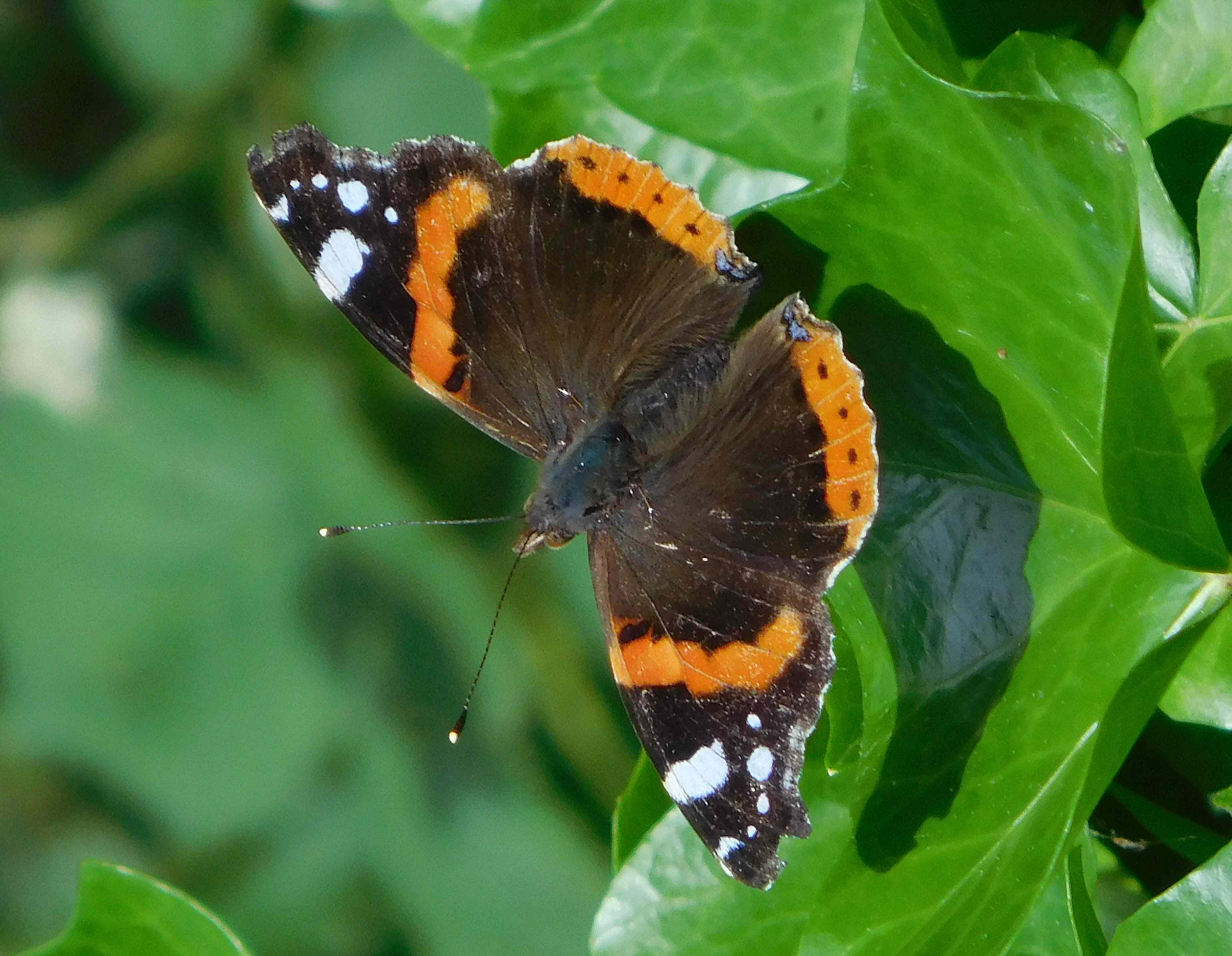
Red admiral, Vanessa atalanta

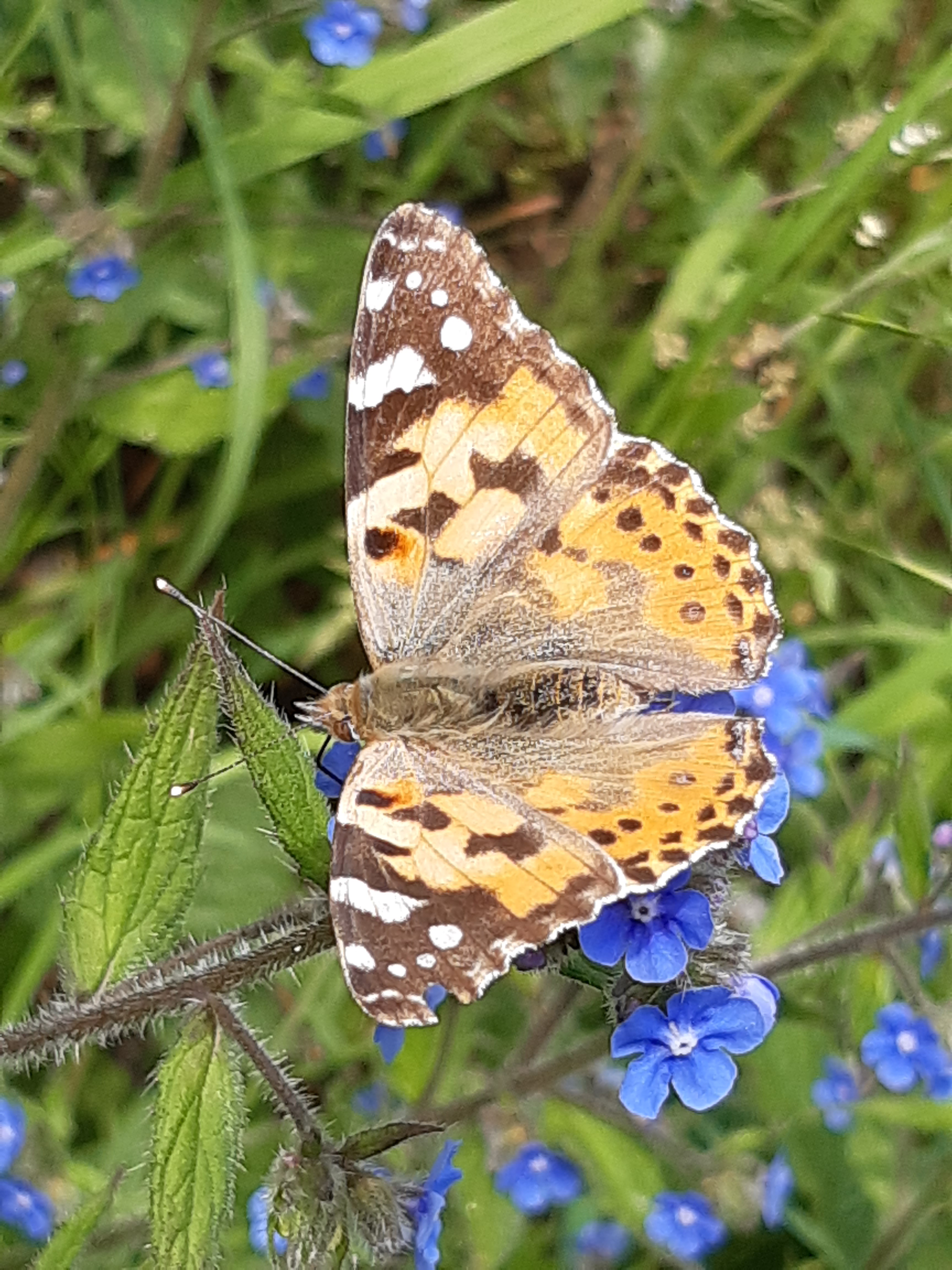
Painted lady, Vanessa cardui, on alkanet

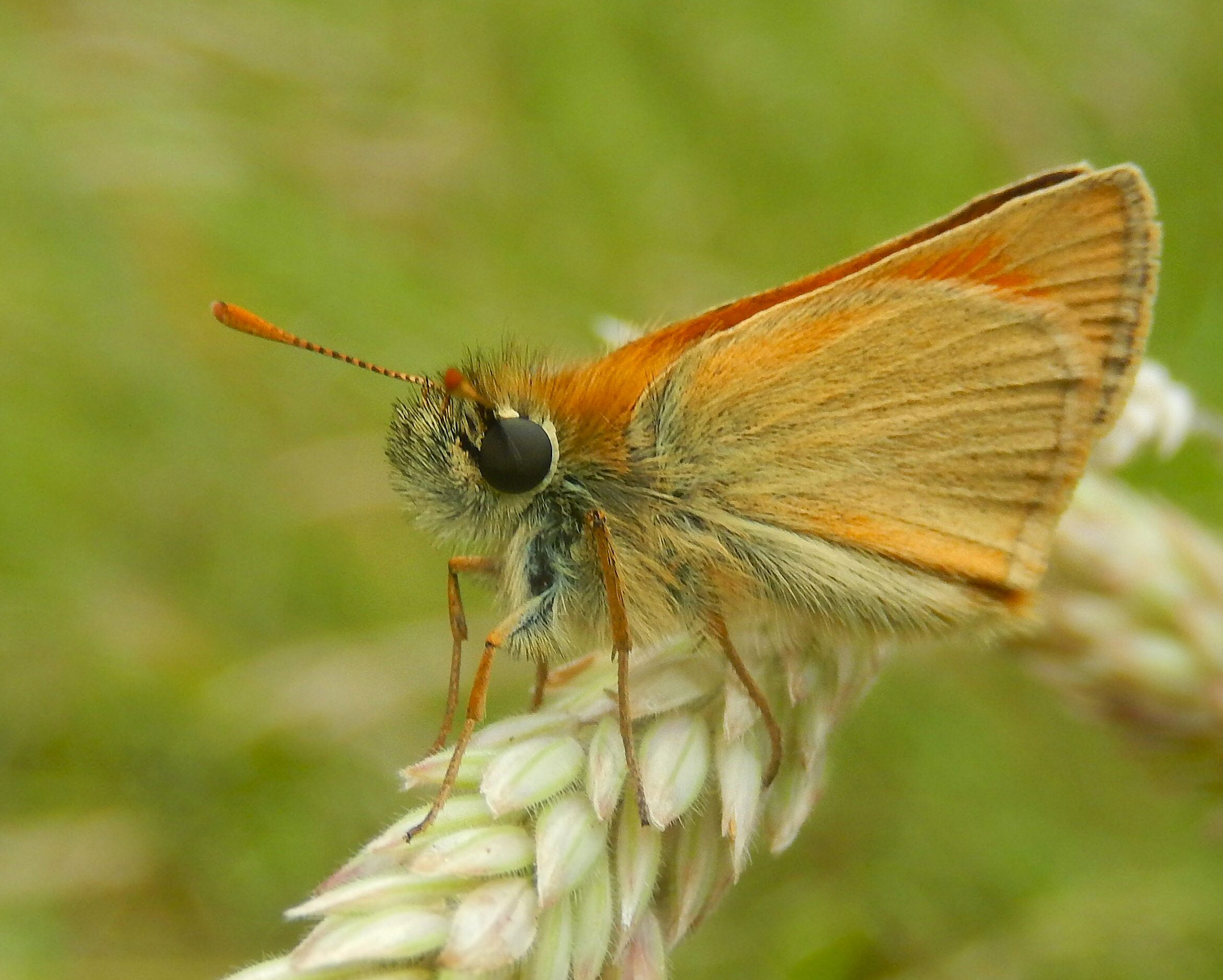
Small skipper, Thymelicus sylvestris, on Yorkshire fog in anthill meadow

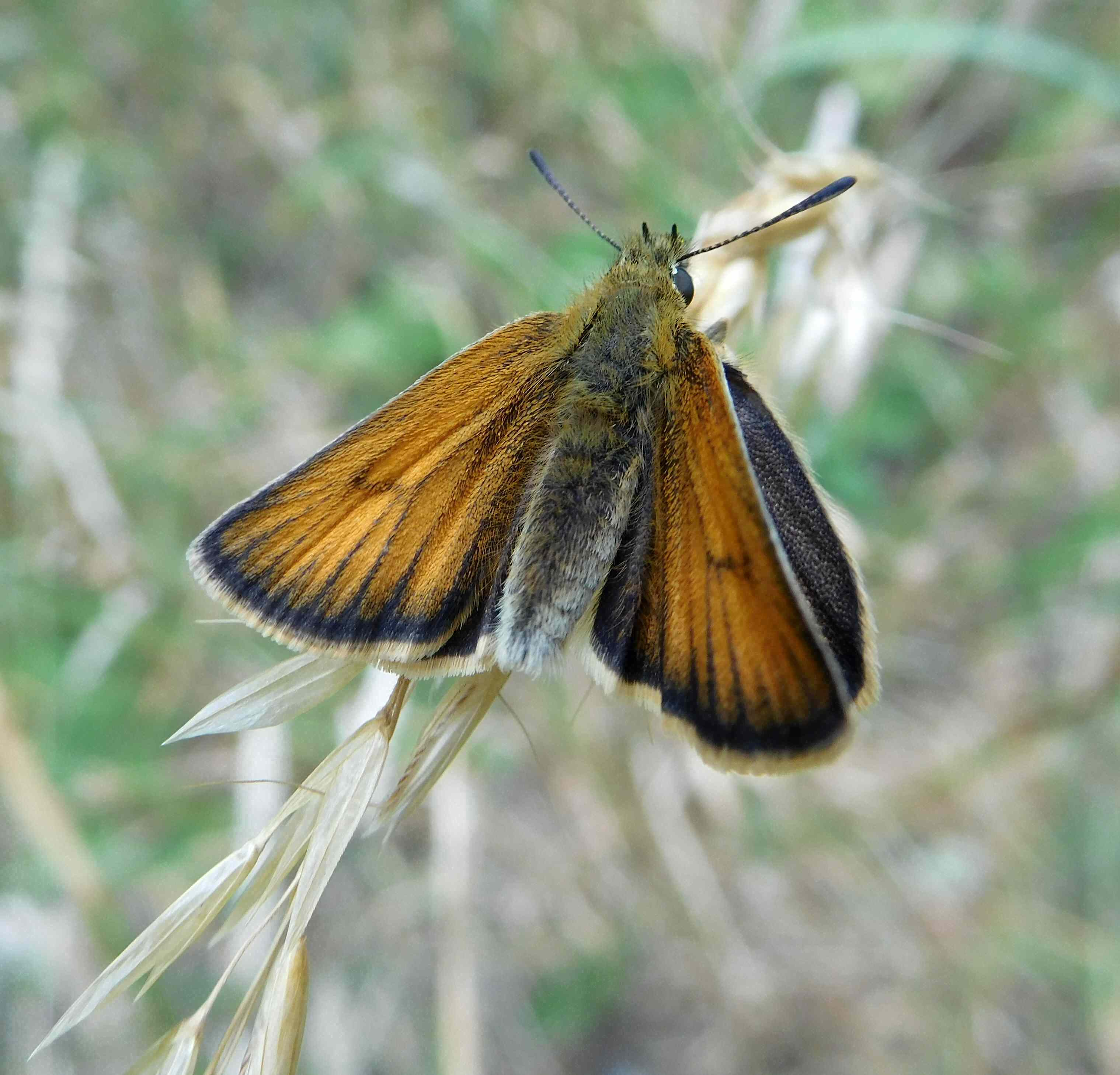
Essex skipper, Thymelicus lineola, on north bank

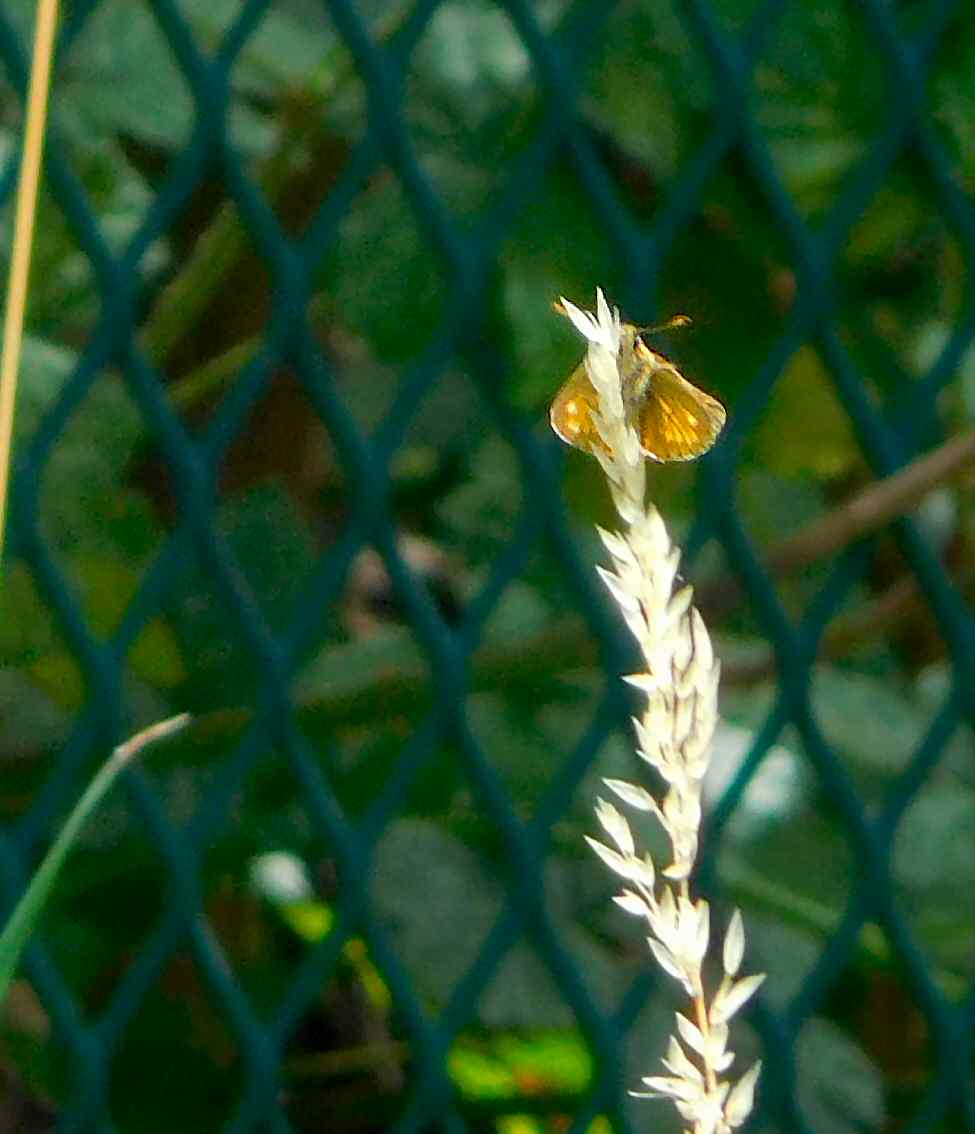
Large skipper, Ochlodes venatus, in ramp meadow

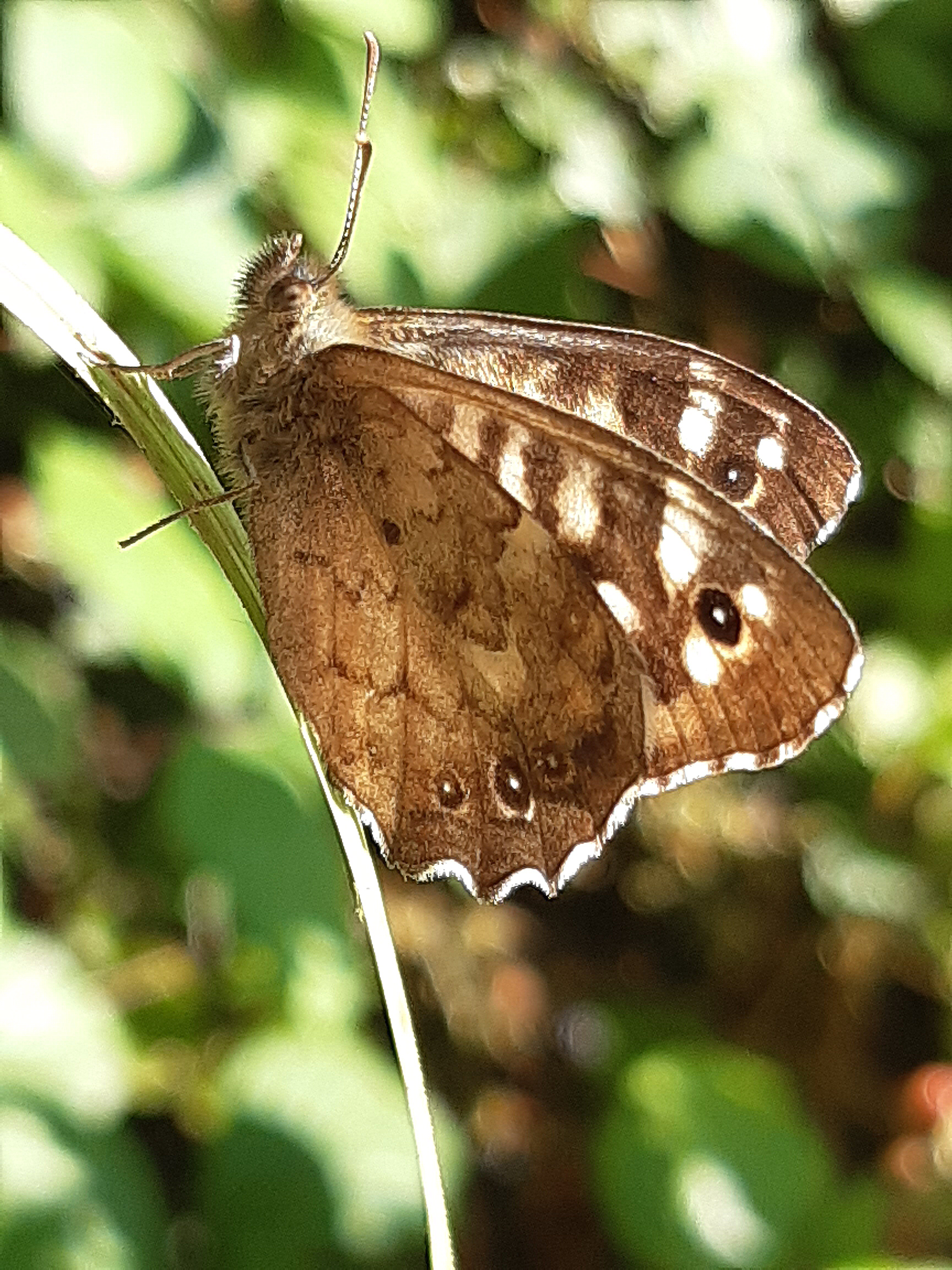
Speckled Wood, Pararge aegeria, on its lookout

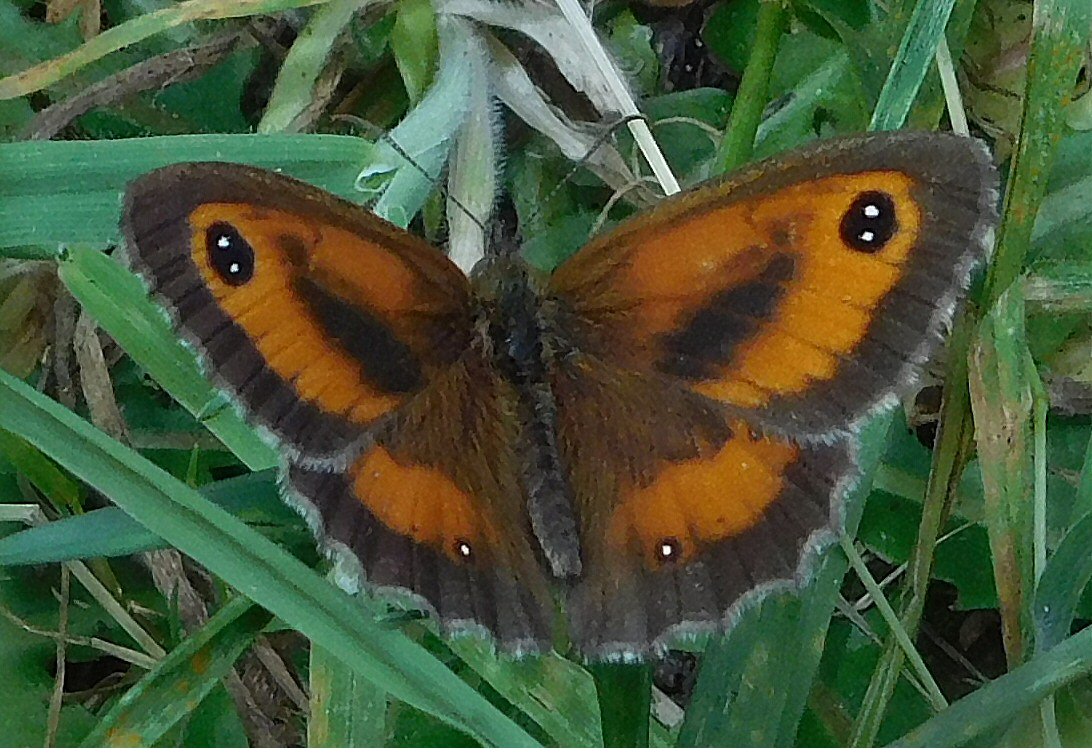
Gatekeeper, Pyronia tithonus

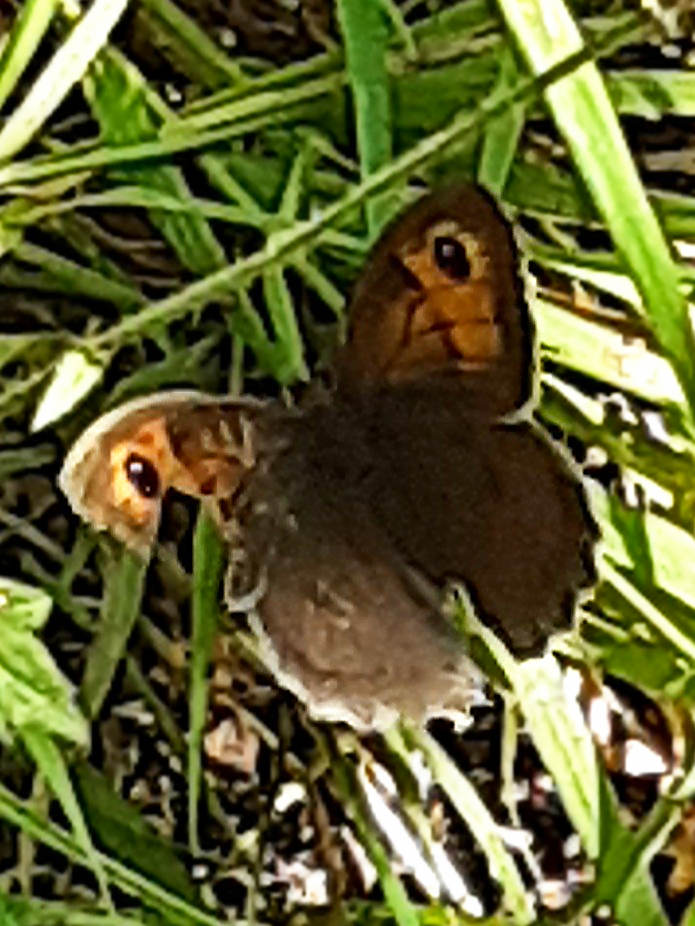
Meadow brown, Maniola jurtina, in Anthill meadow

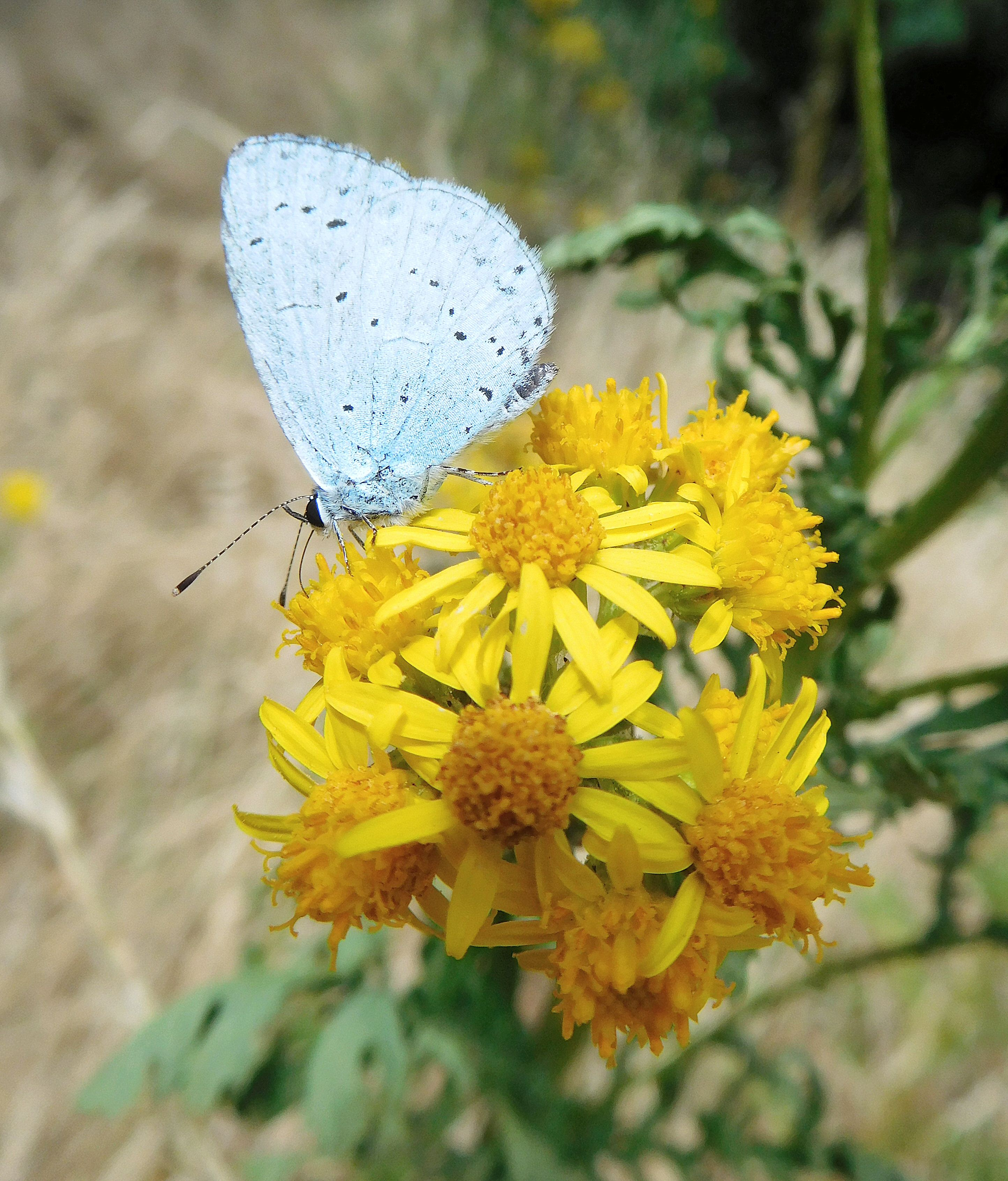
Holly blue, Celastrina argiolus, on ragwort

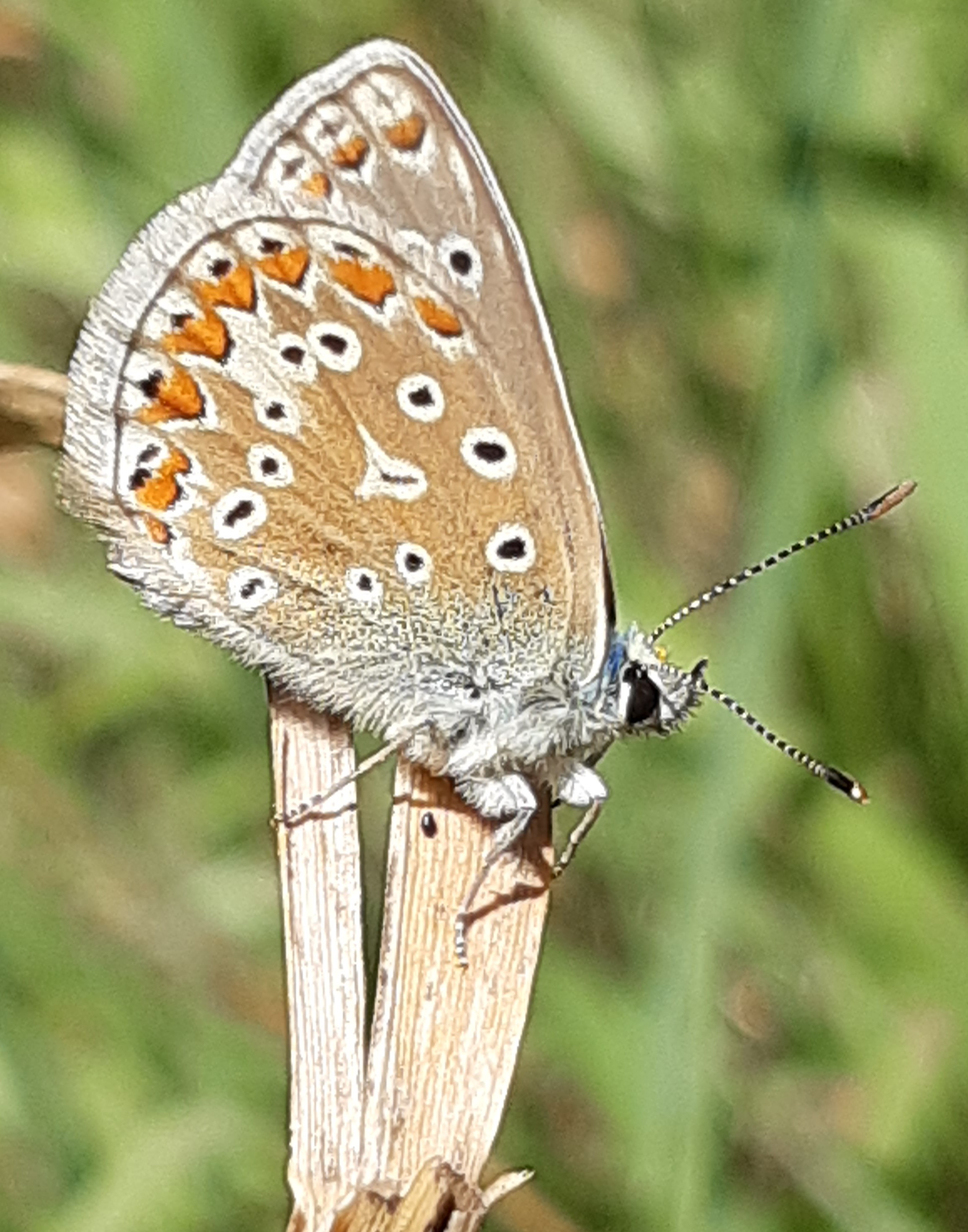
Common blue, Polyommatus icarus, in Small Meadow

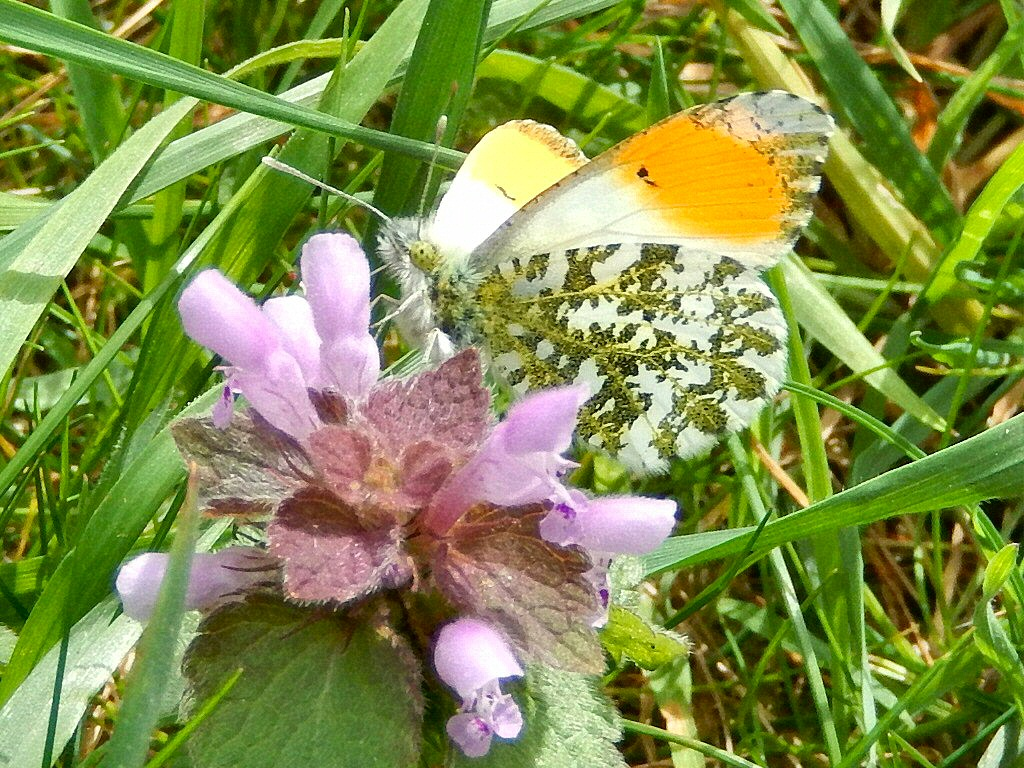
Orange Tip, Anthocharis cardamines

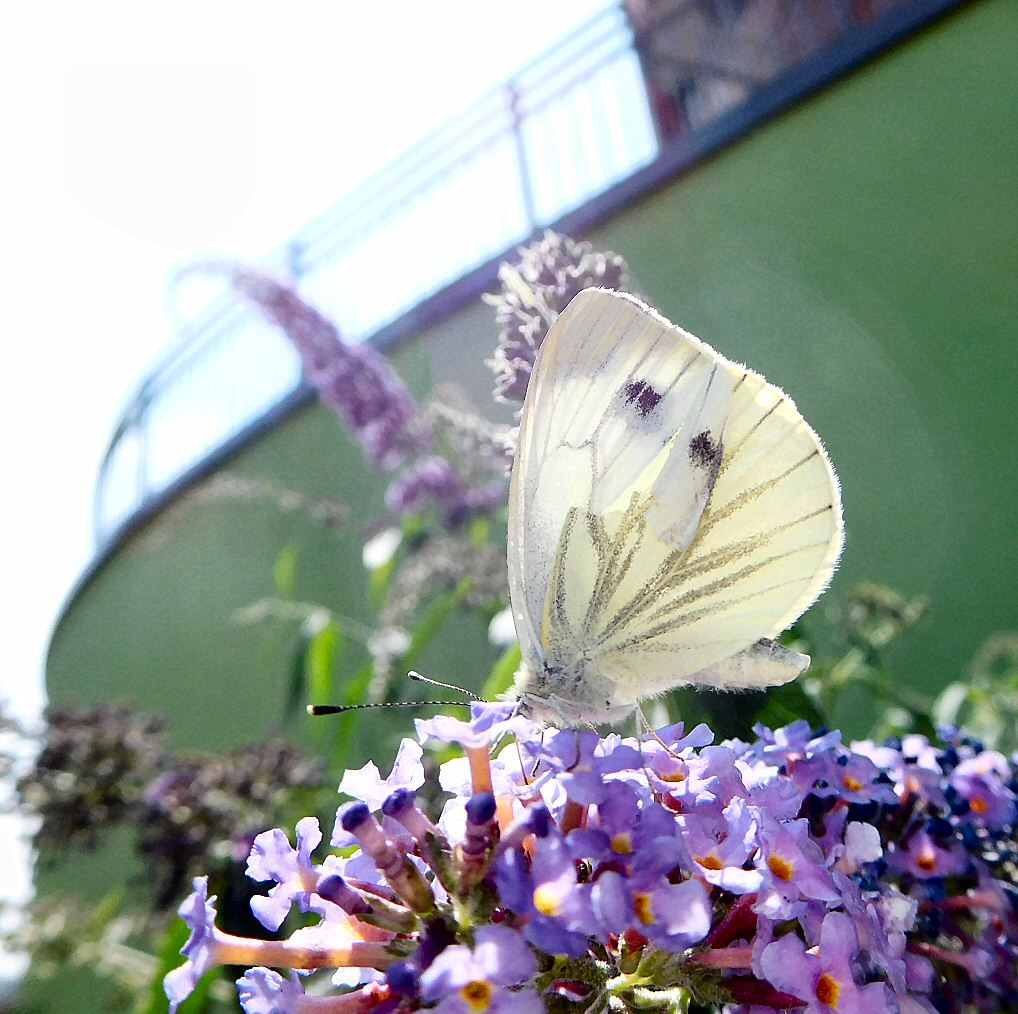
Green-veined white, Pieris napi, on Buddleia

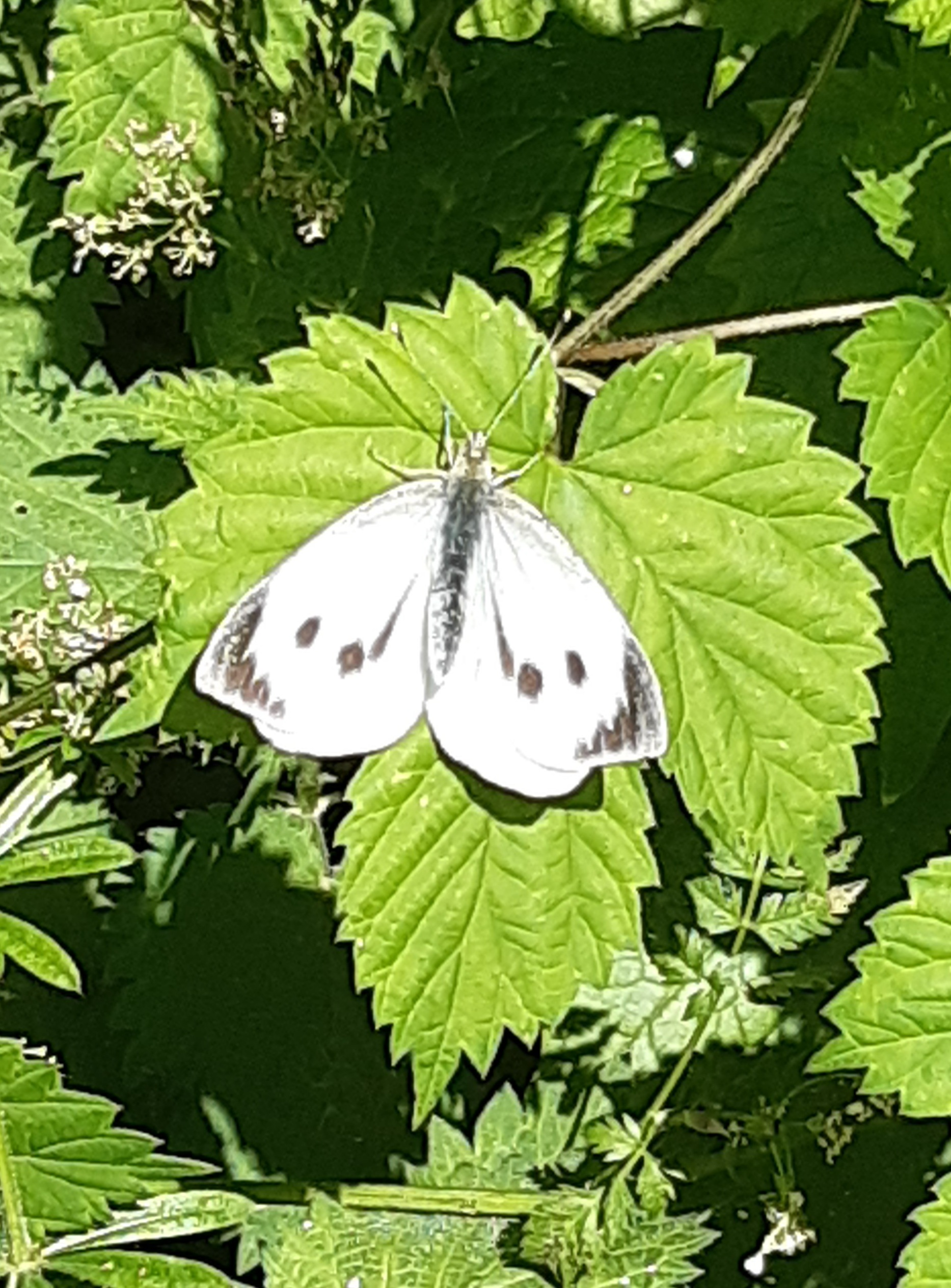
Large White, Pieris brassicae, in Ramp Meadow

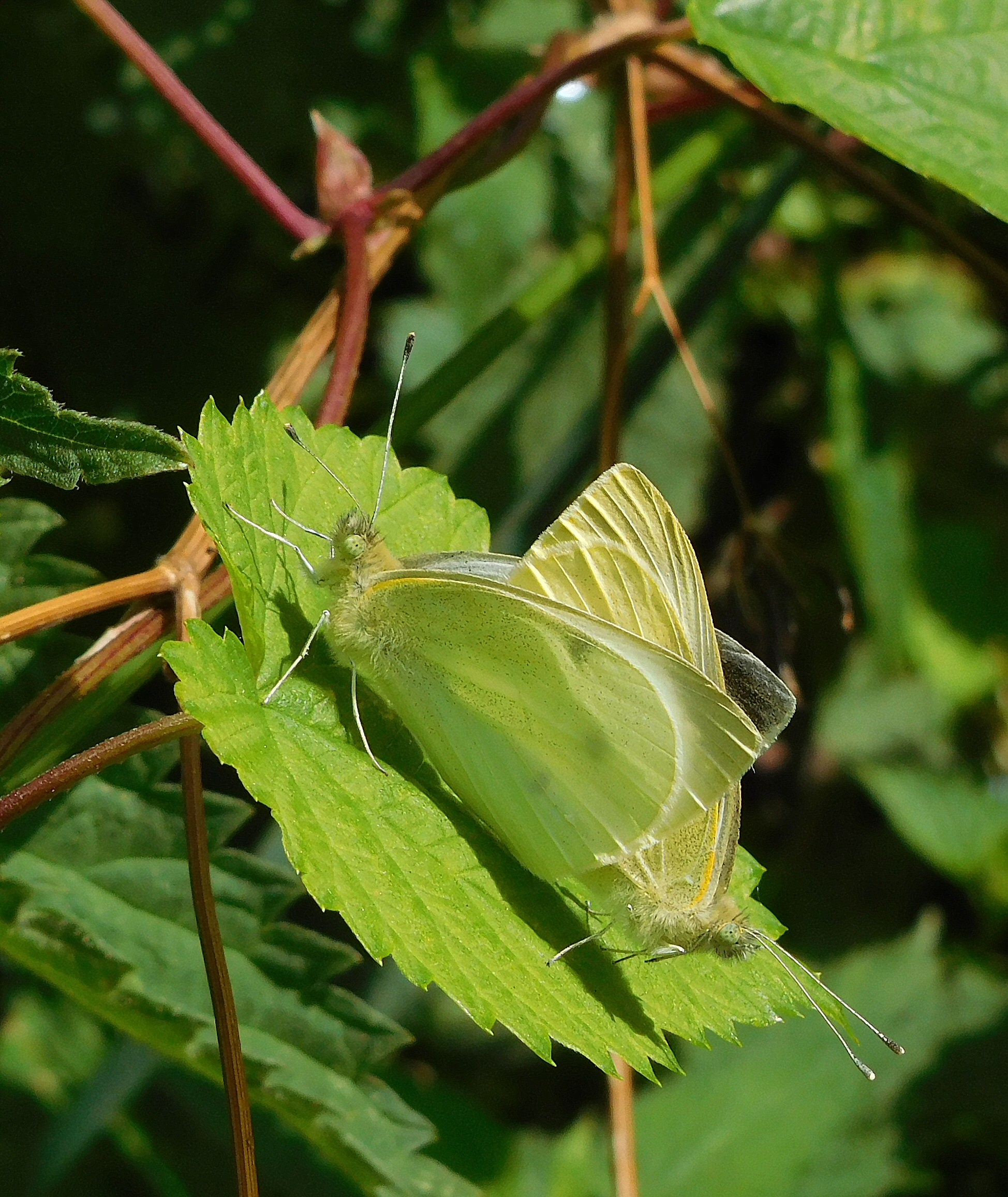
Small White, Pieris rapae, mating on hops

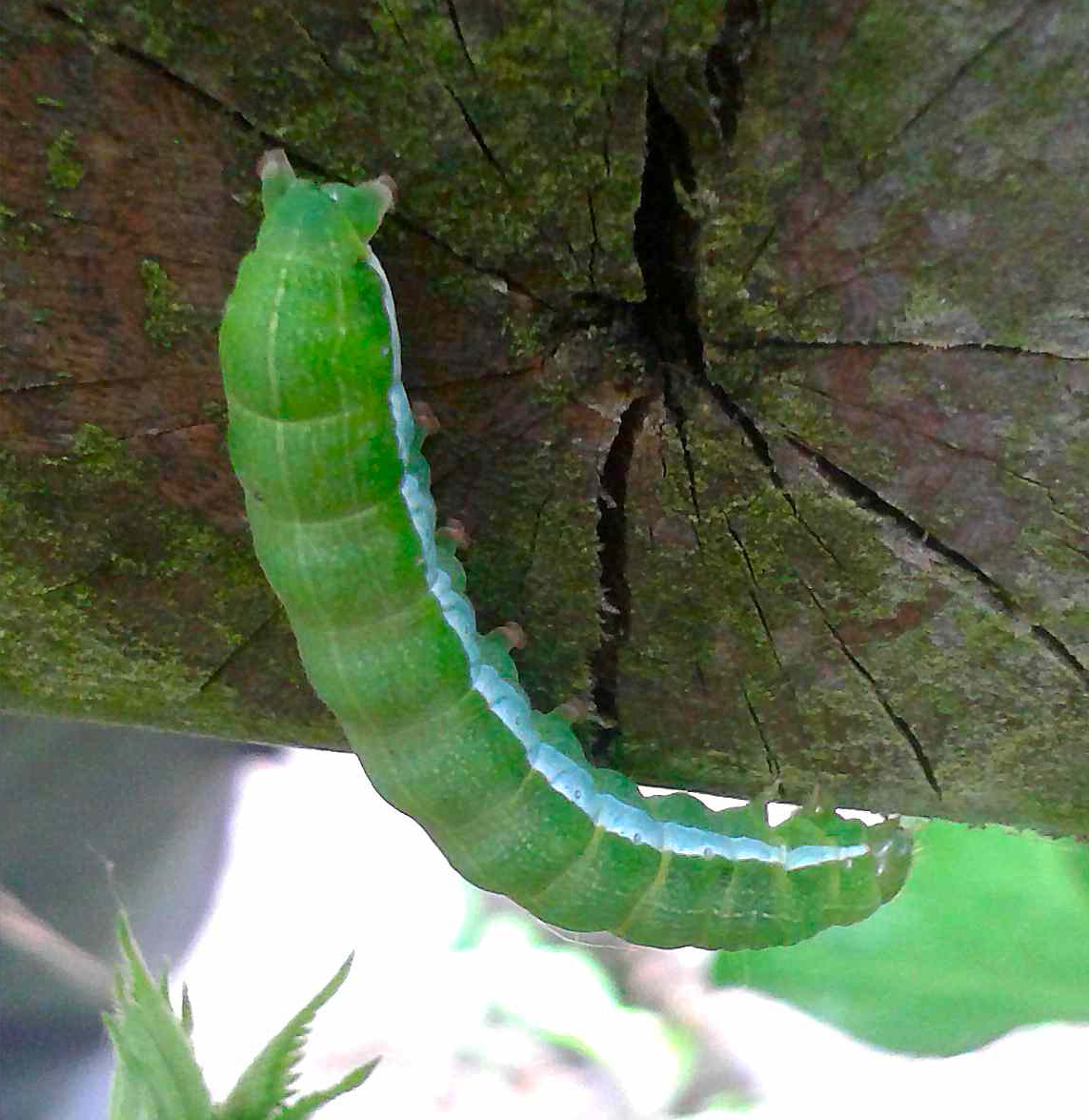
Brimstone caterpillar, Gonepteryx rhamni

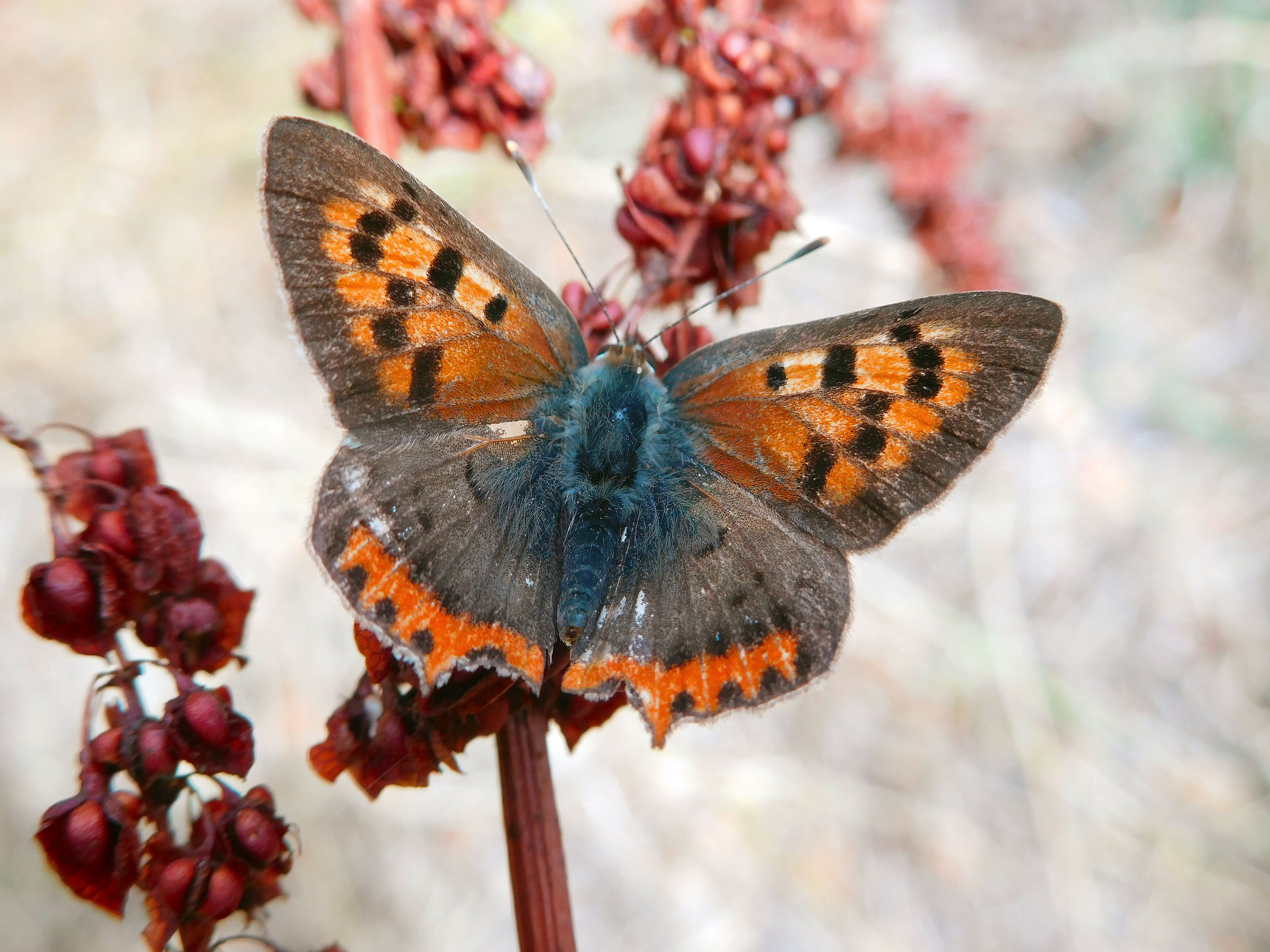
Small copper, Lycaena phlaeas

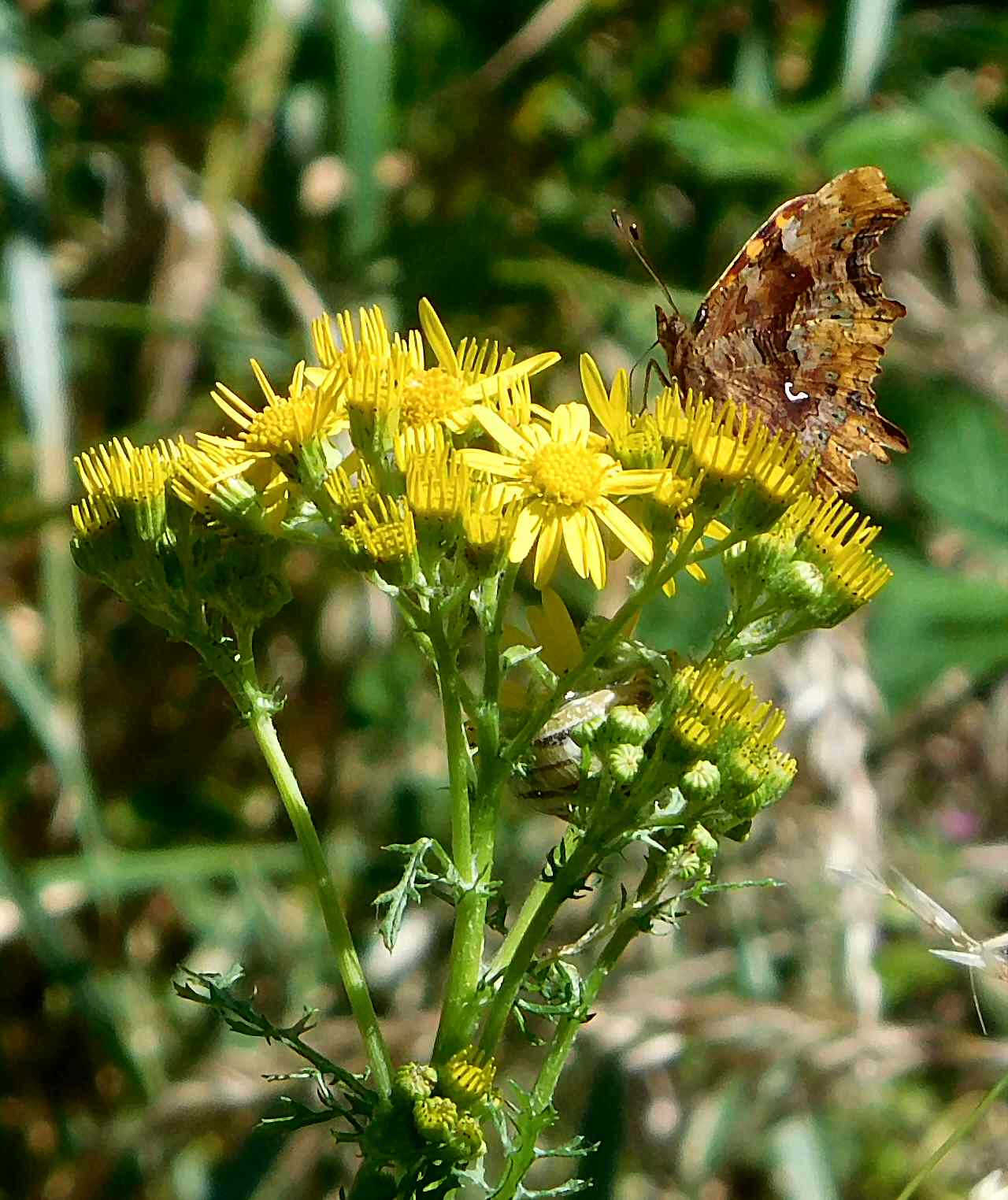
Comma, Polygonia c-album, on ragwort, showing white 'comma' mark

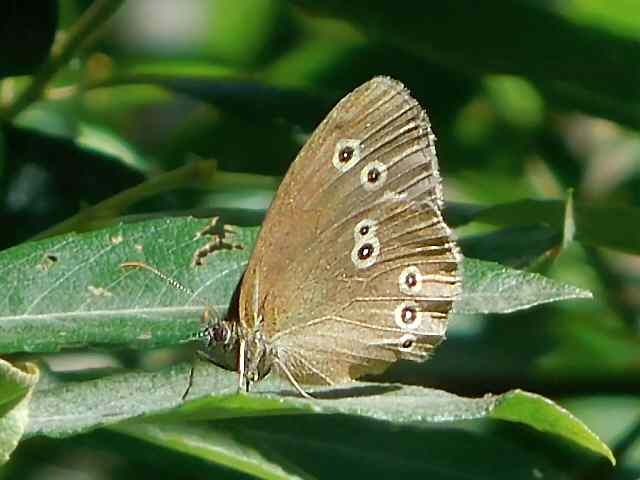
Ringlet, Aphantopus hyperantus

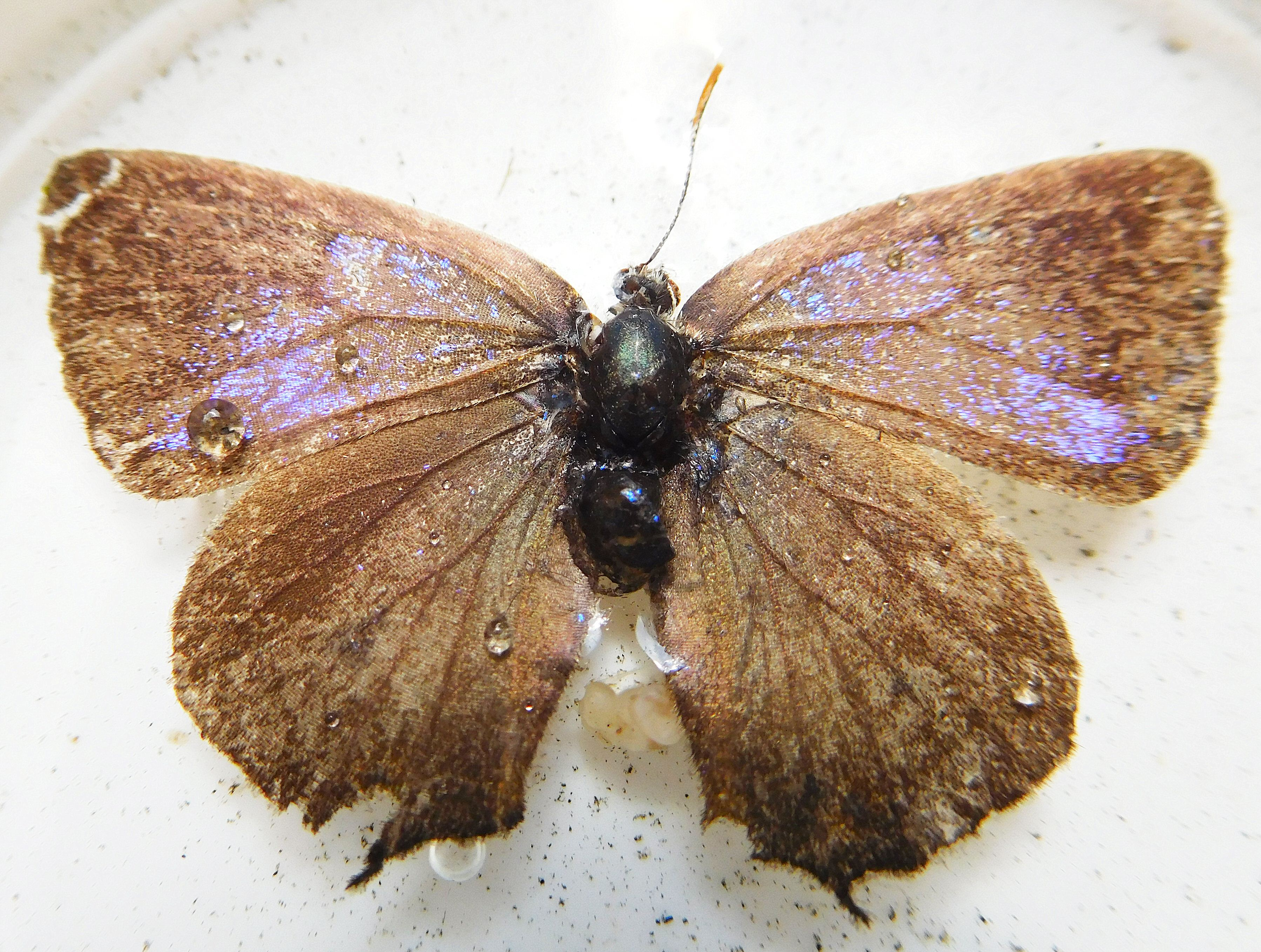
Purple hairstreak found in main pond

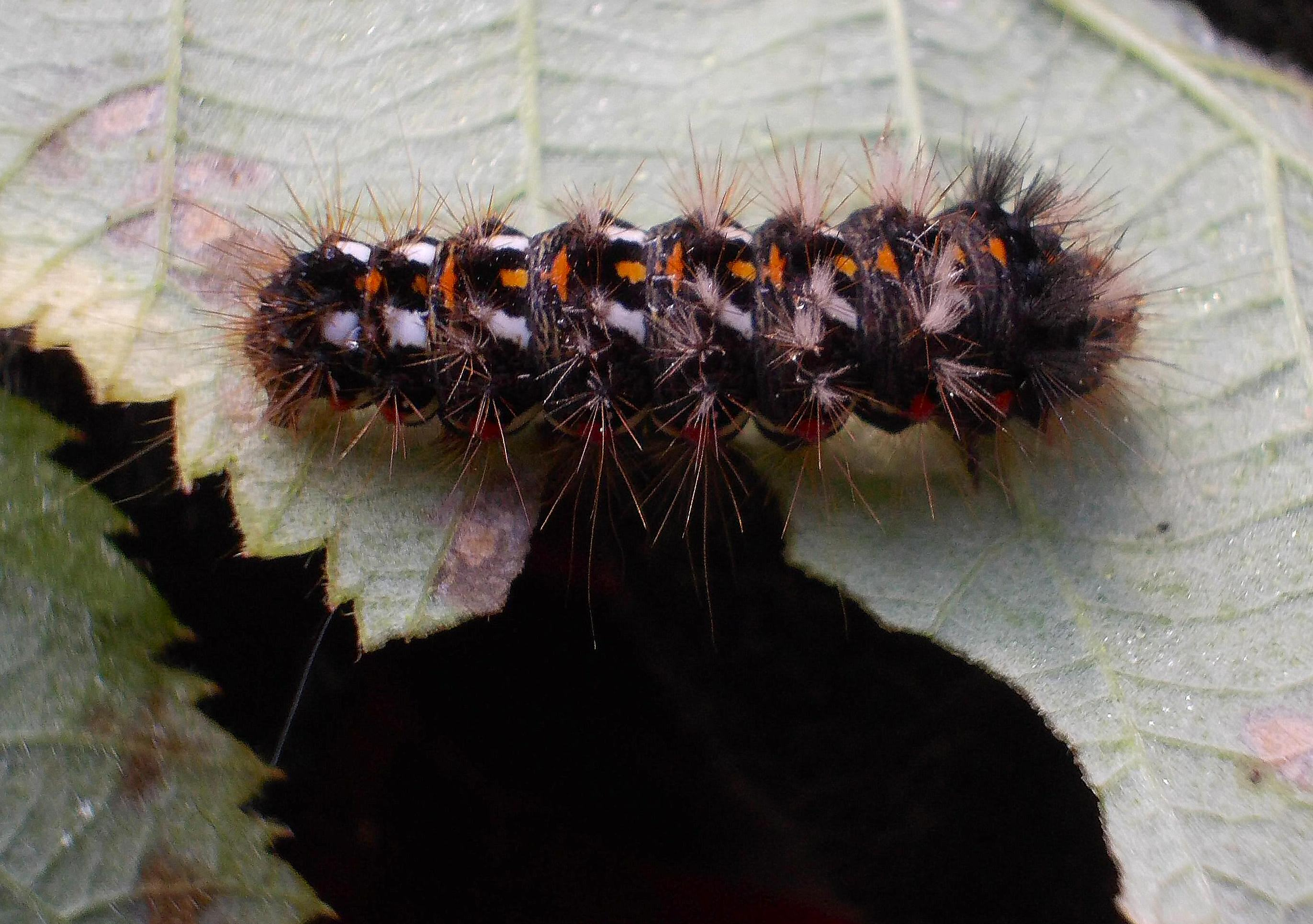
Knotgrass moth caterpillar, Acronicta rumicis

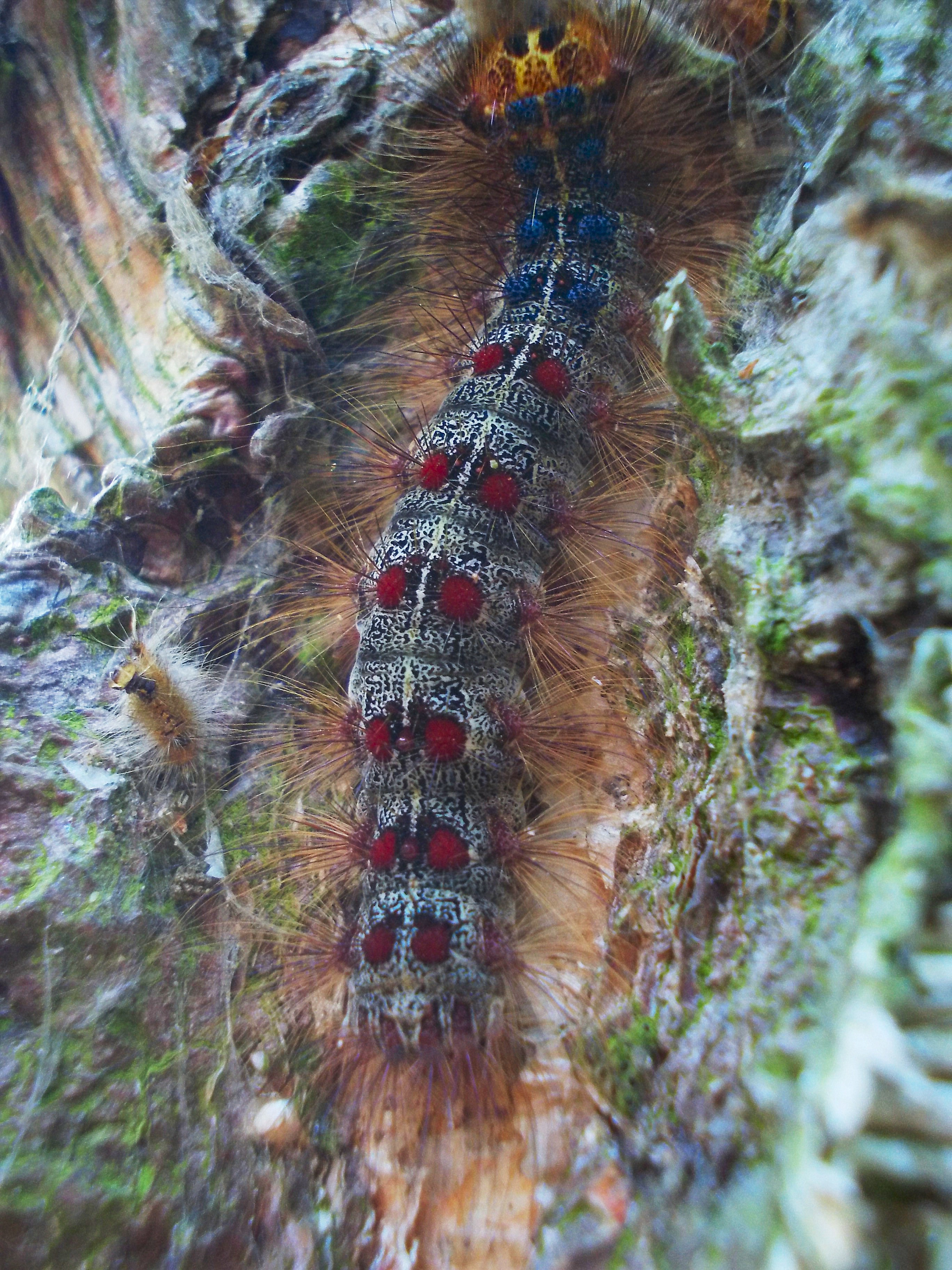
Gypsy moth caterpillar, Lymantria dispar dispar, on birch trunk

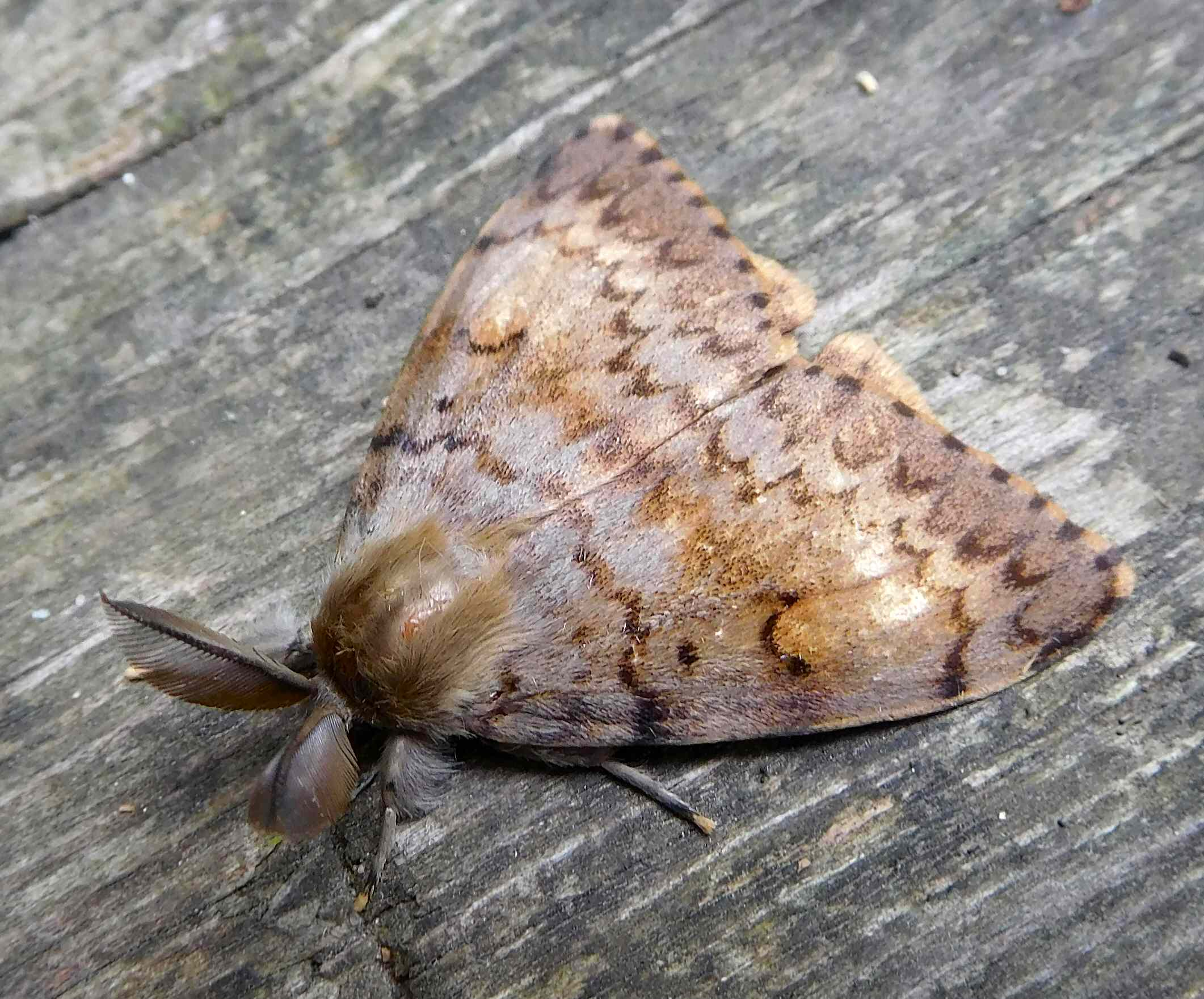
Gypsy moth male

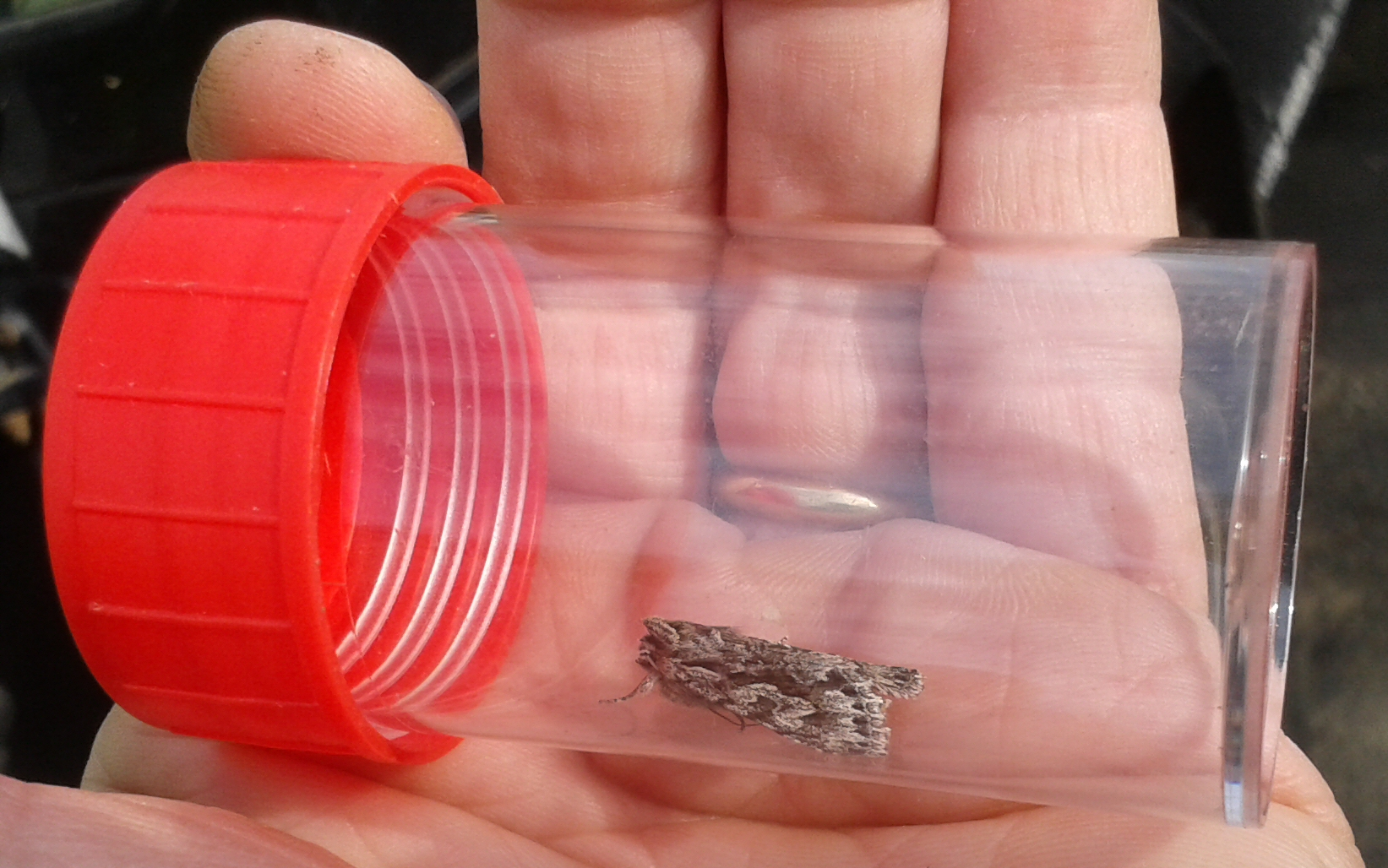
Early grey moth, Xylocampa areola

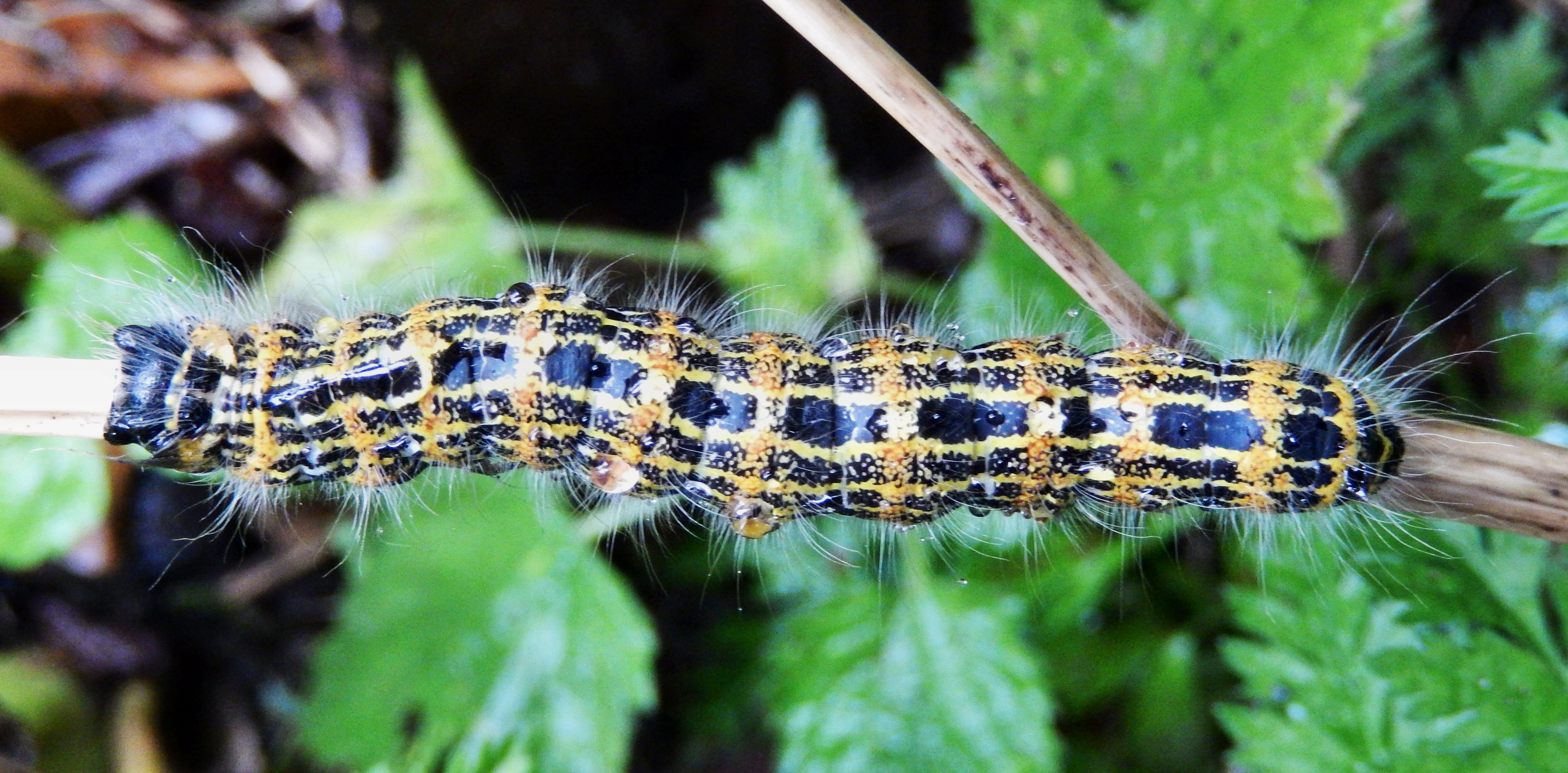
Buff-tip moth caterpillar, Phalera bucephala, 70 mm long

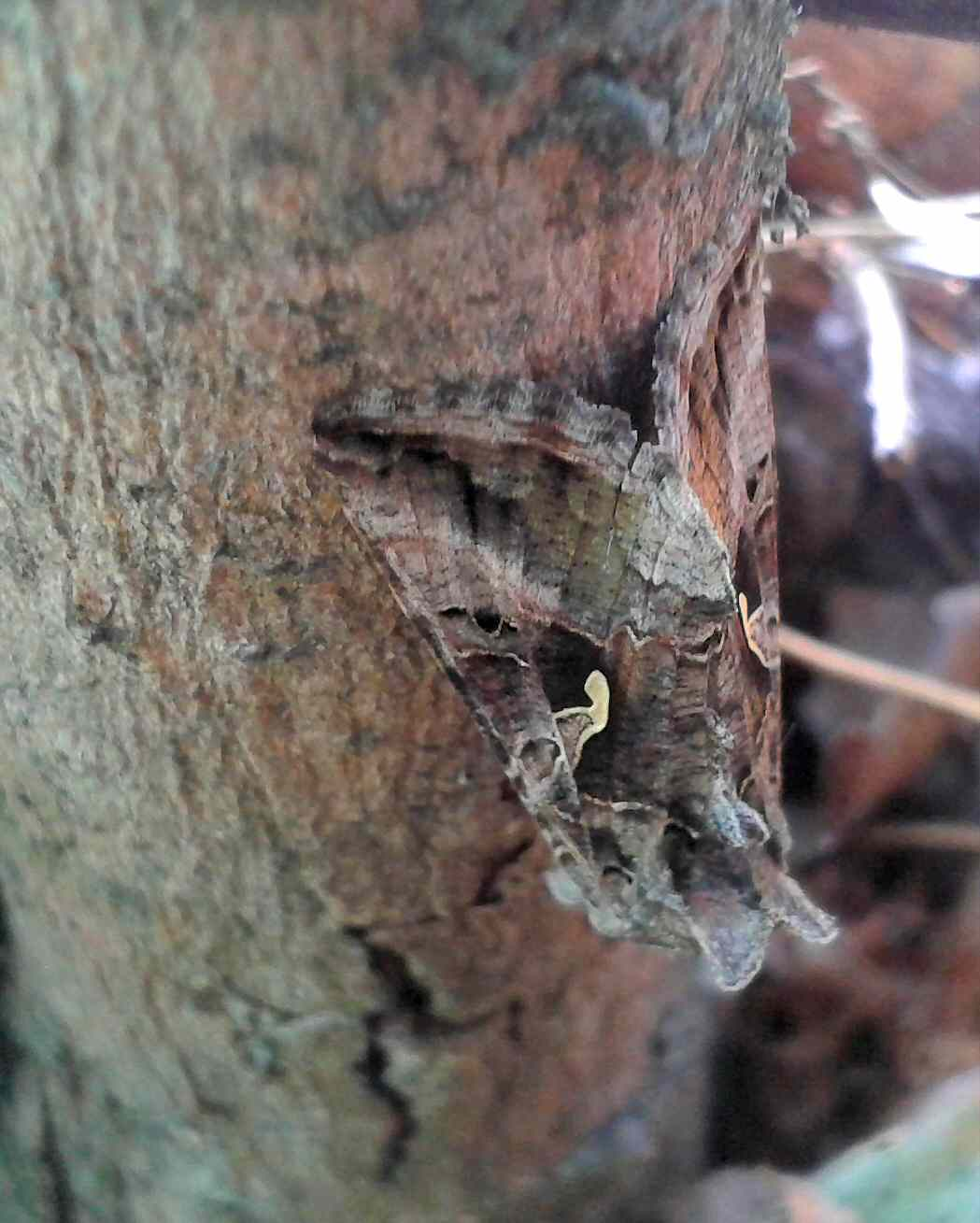
Silver Y moth, Autographa gamma, hiding on a log

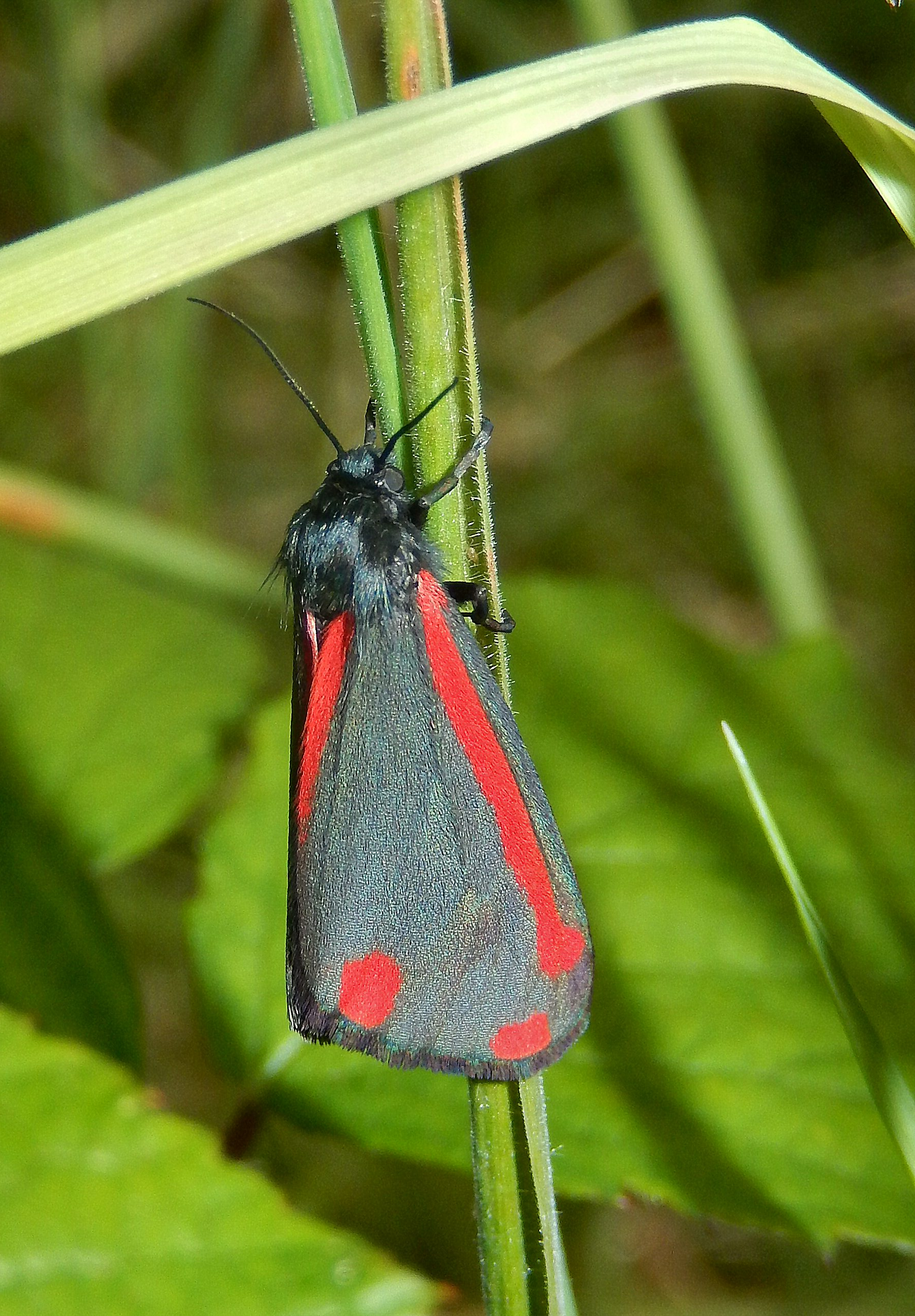
Cinnabar moth, Tyria jacobaeae, in small meadow

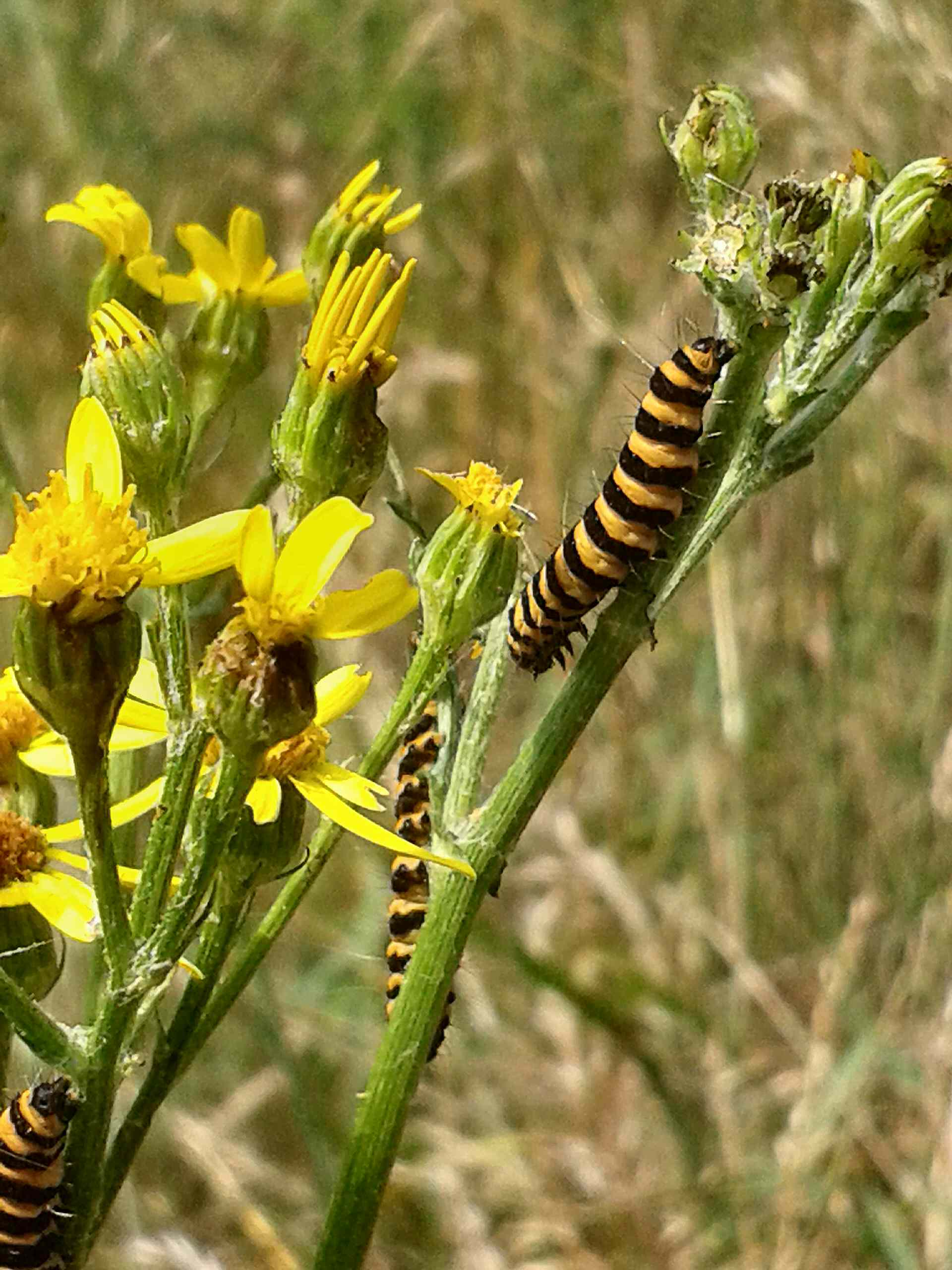
Cinnabar moth caterpillars on ragwort on north bank

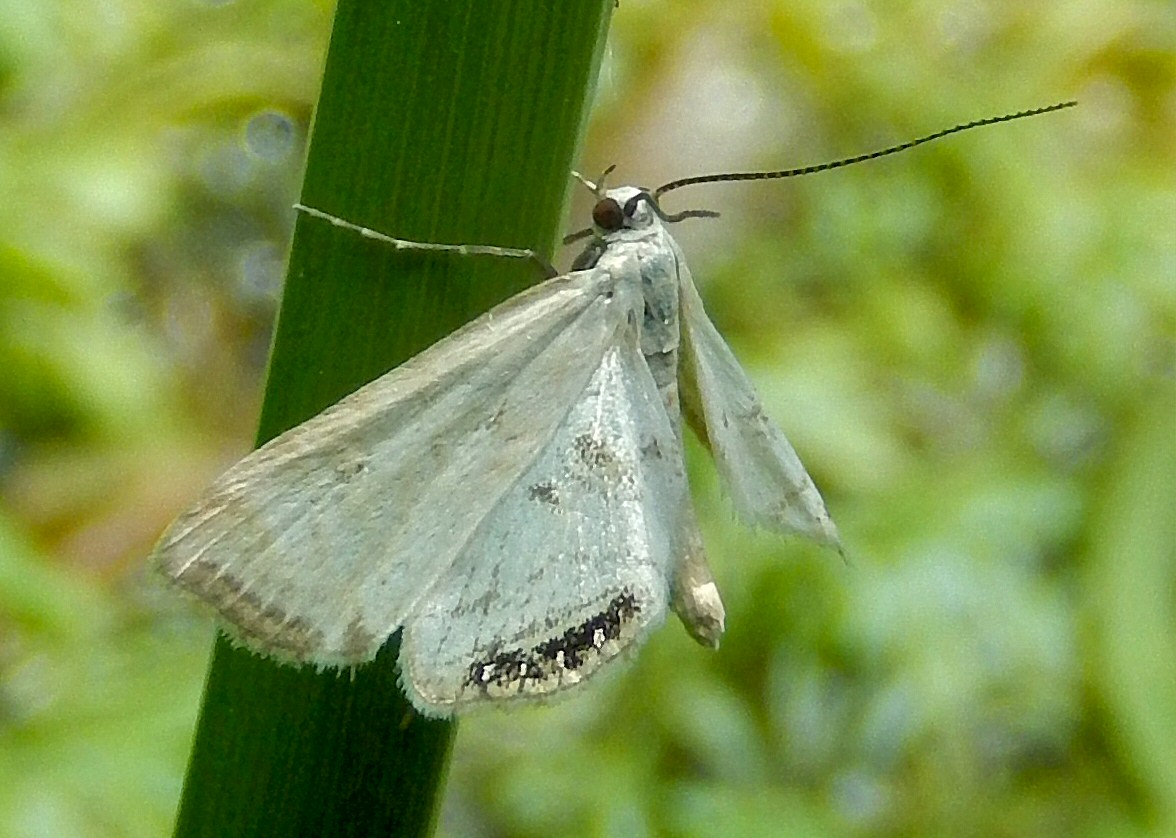
Small china-mark moth, Cataclysta lemnata, always found near water

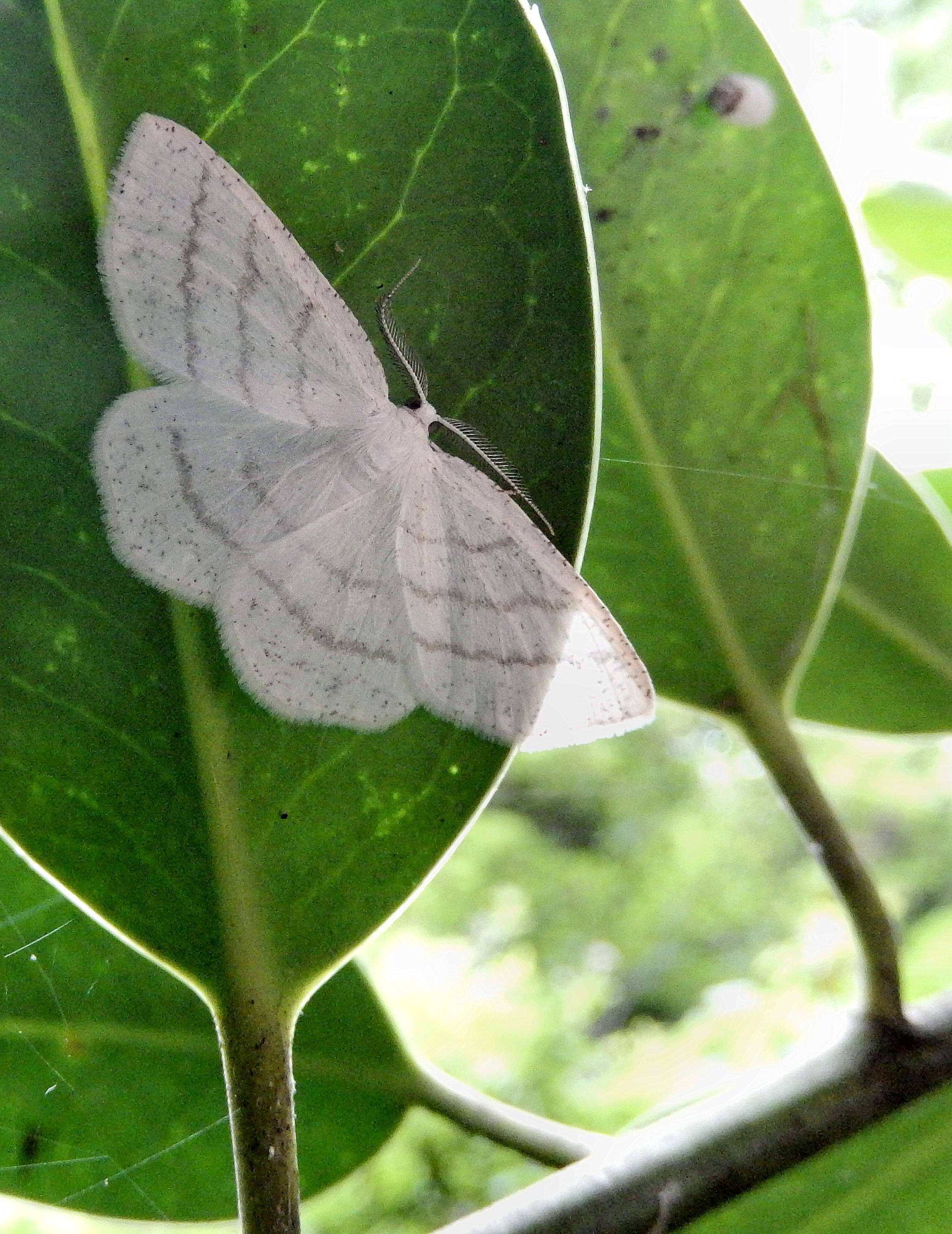
Common white wave moth, Cabera pusaria

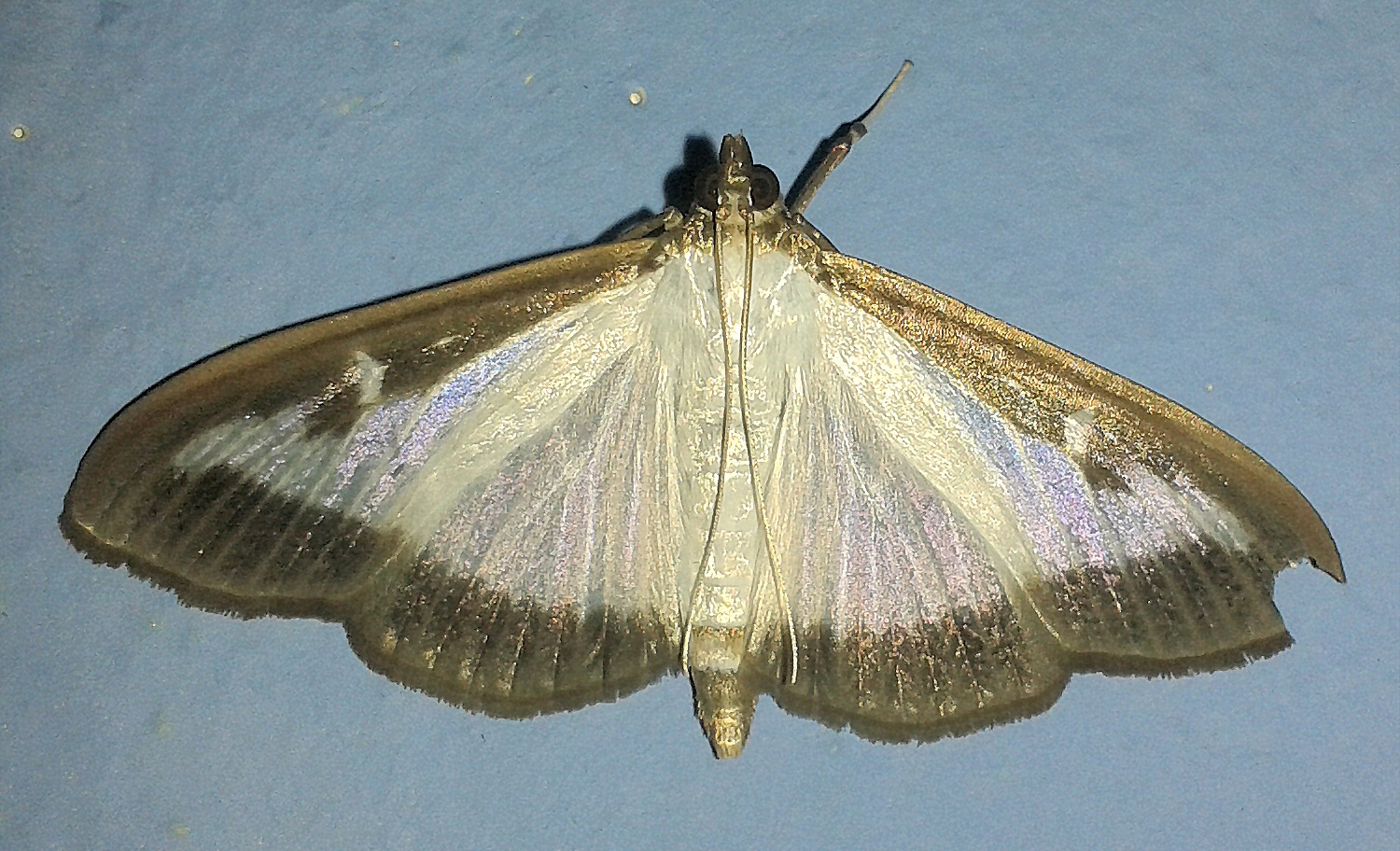
Box tree moth, Cydalima perspectalis

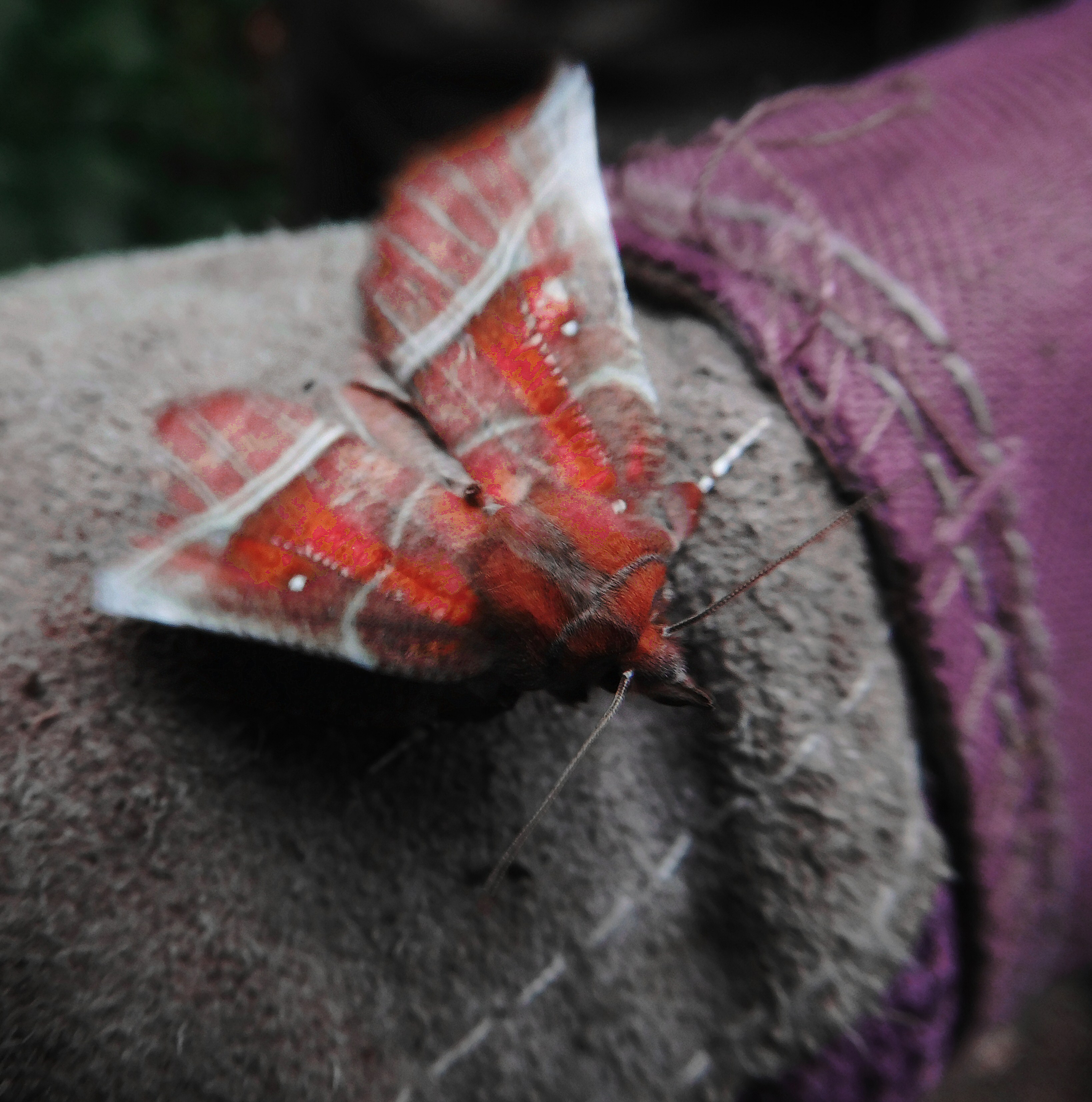
Herald moth, Scoliopteryx libatrix, warming up on a cold day by whirring its wings

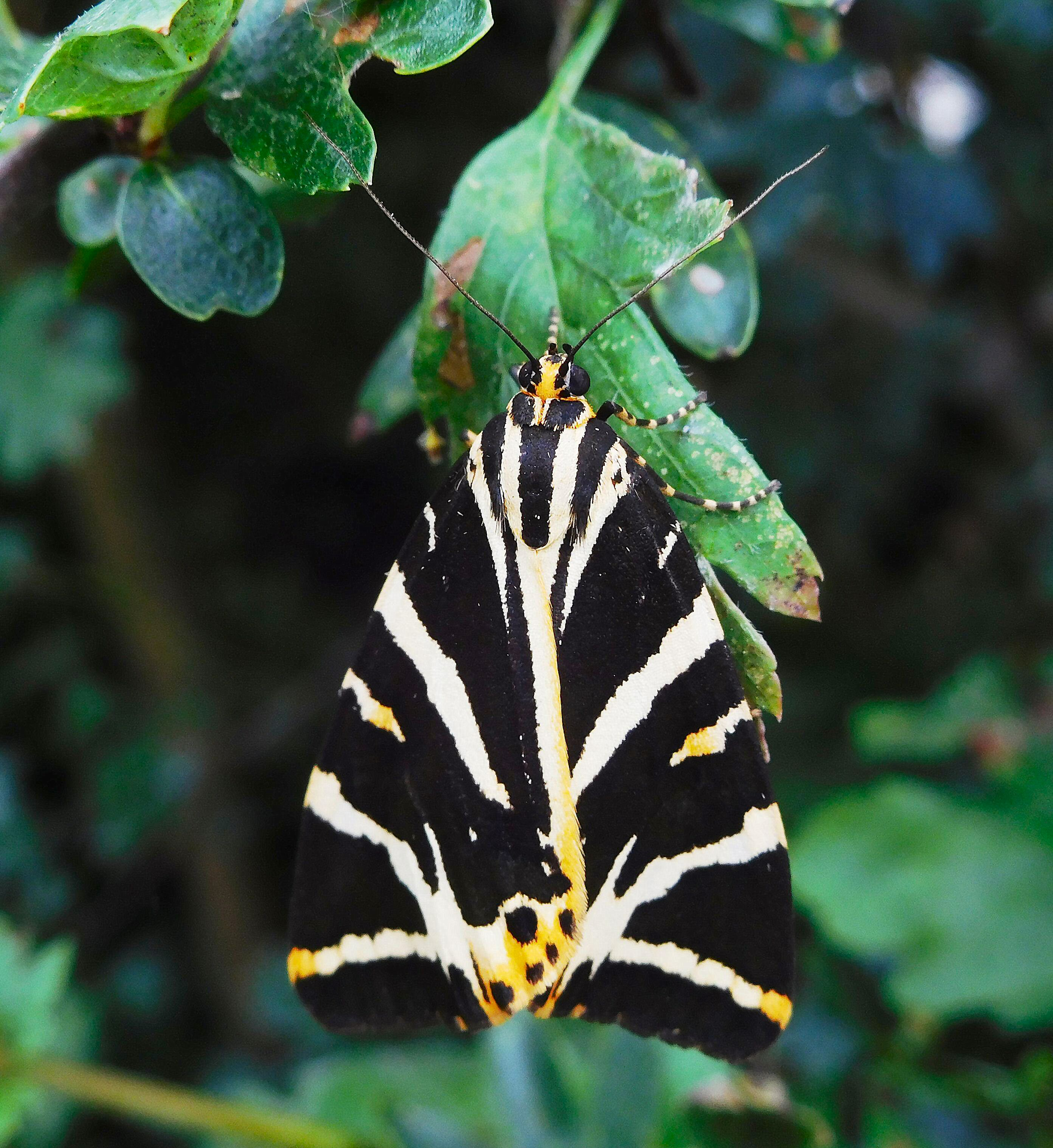
Jersey tiger moth, Euplagia quadripunctaria

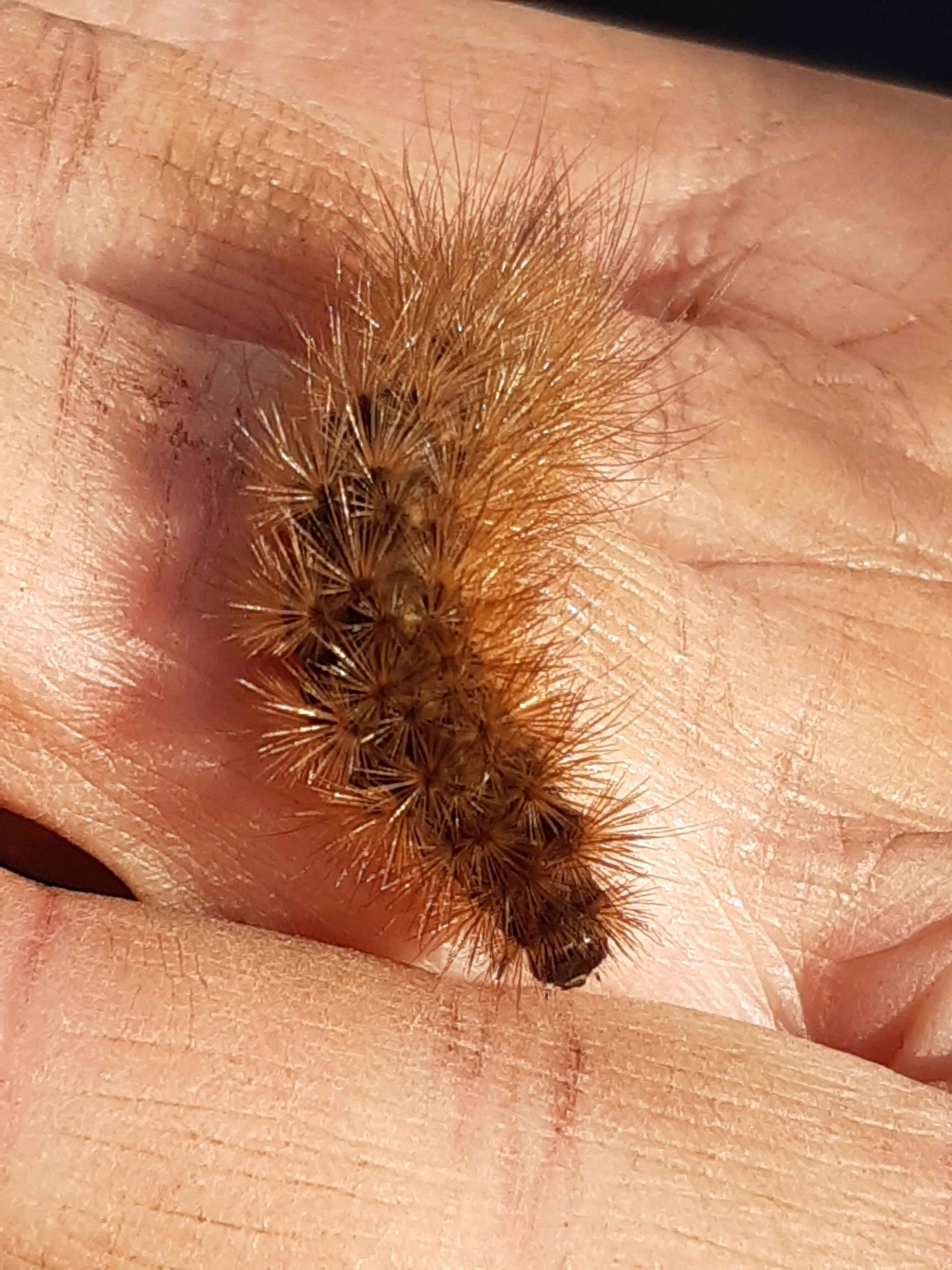
Ruby tiger caterpillar, Phragmatobia fuliginosa

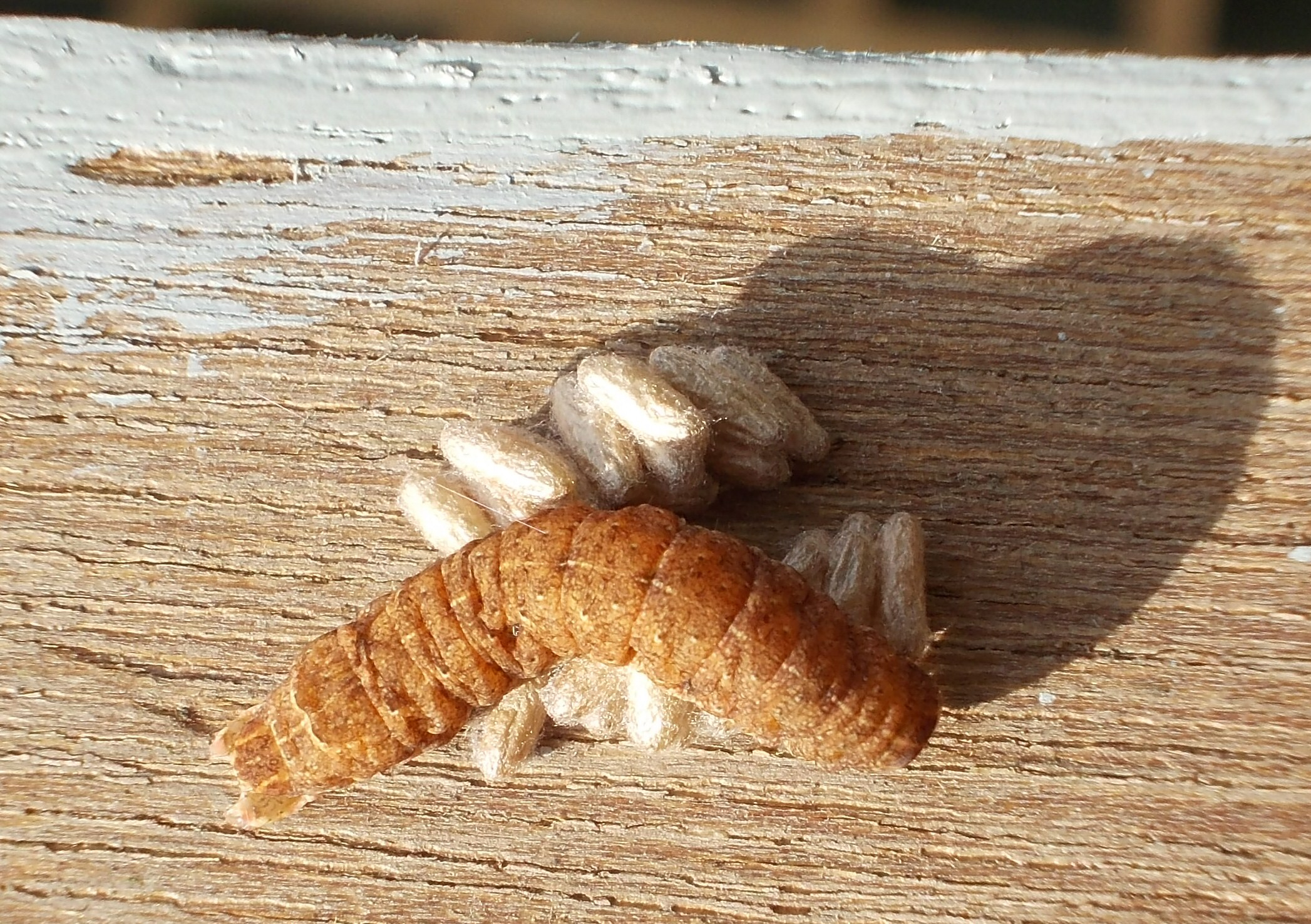
Pupae of parasitoidal wasps (Braconidae) on broad-bordered yellow underwing moth caterpillar (Noctua fimbriata)

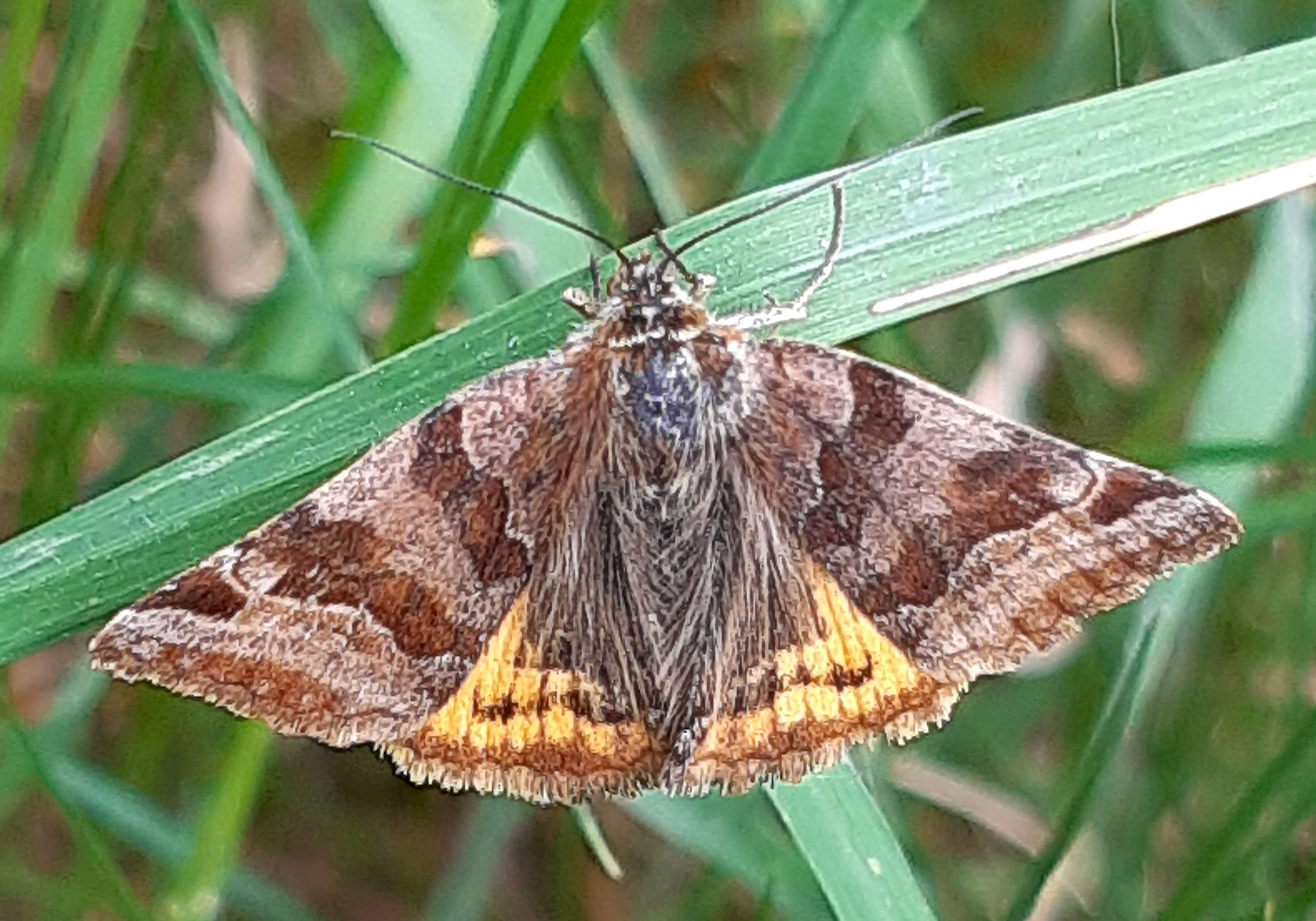
Burnet Companion moth, Euclidia glyphica, in Anthill Meadow

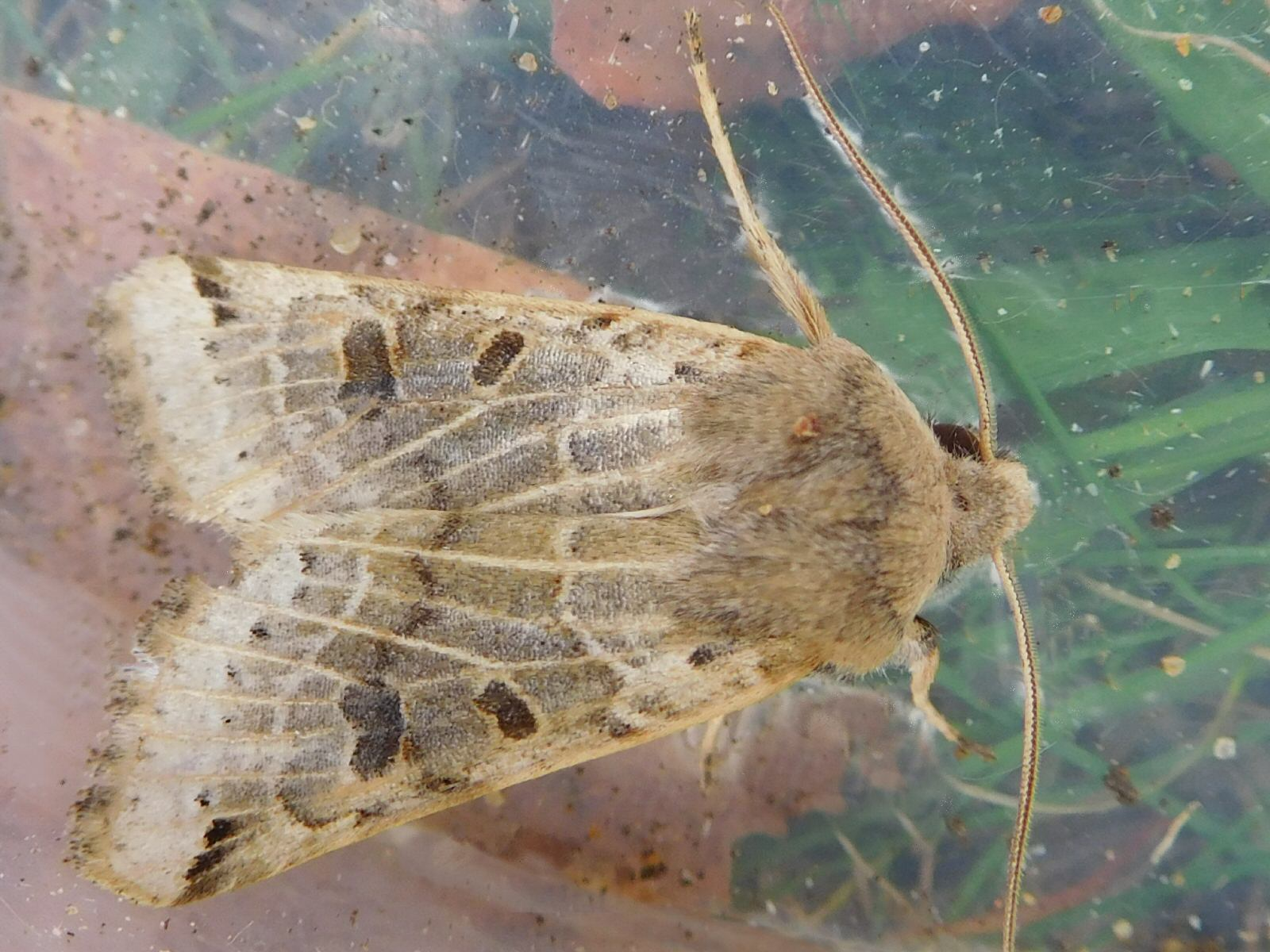
Lunar Underwing moth, Omphaloscelis lunosa, from Small Meadow

Dragonflies and damselflies
Dragonflies and damselflies

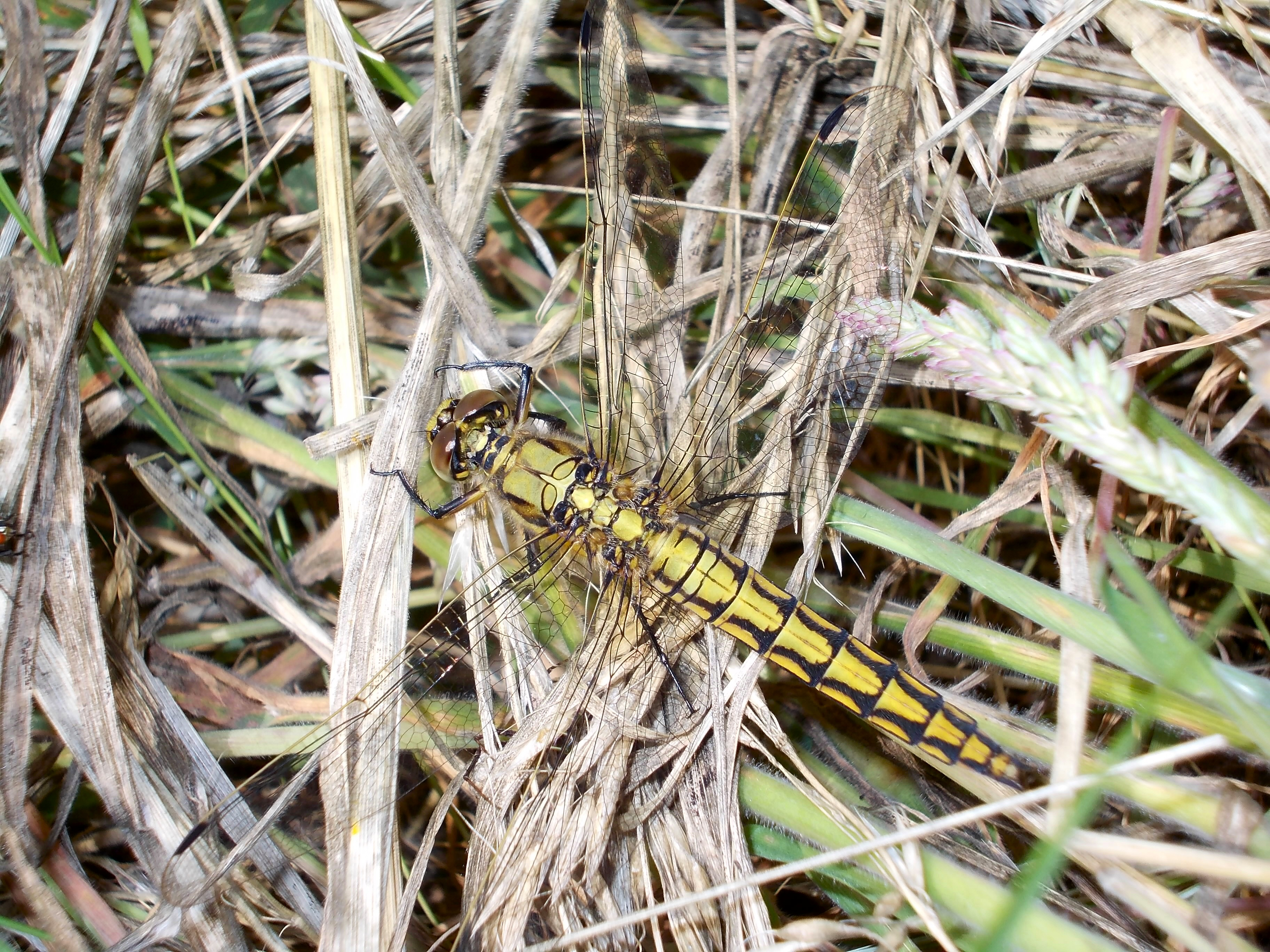
Female black-tailed skimmer dragonfly, Orthetrum cancellatum

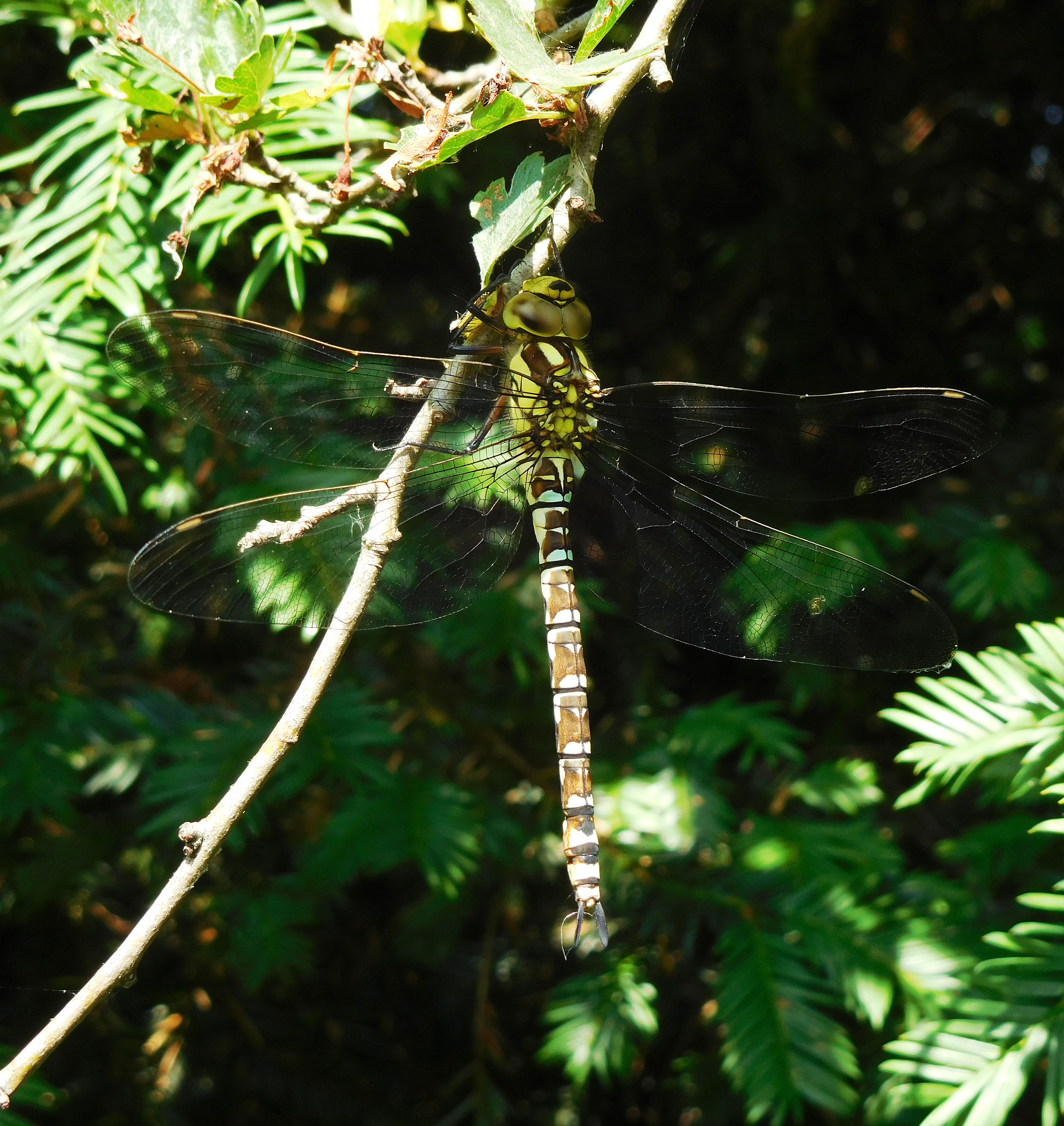
Southern hawker dragonfly, Aeshna cyanea

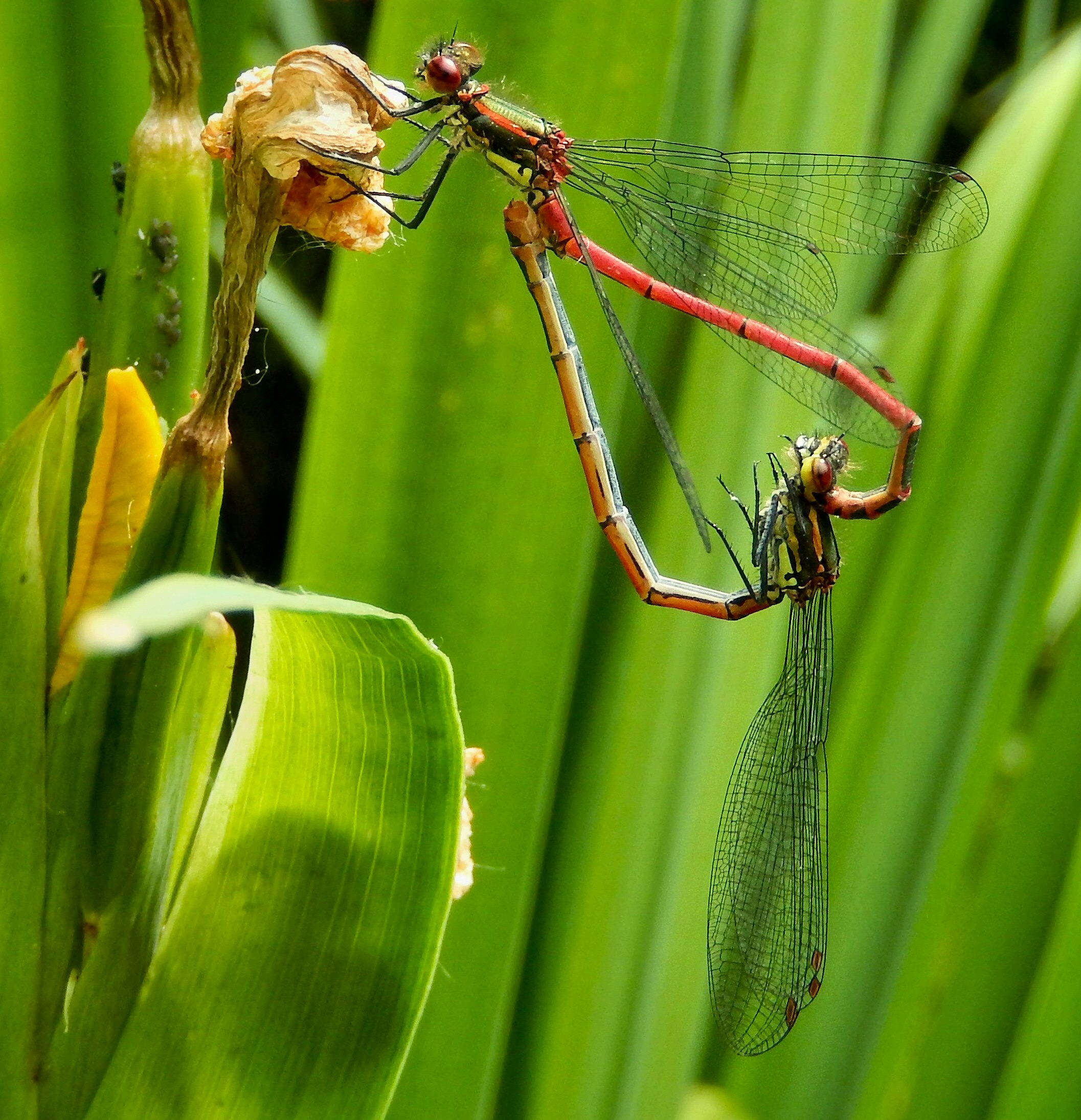
Large red damselflies, Pyrrhosoma nymphula, in wheel on yellow iris

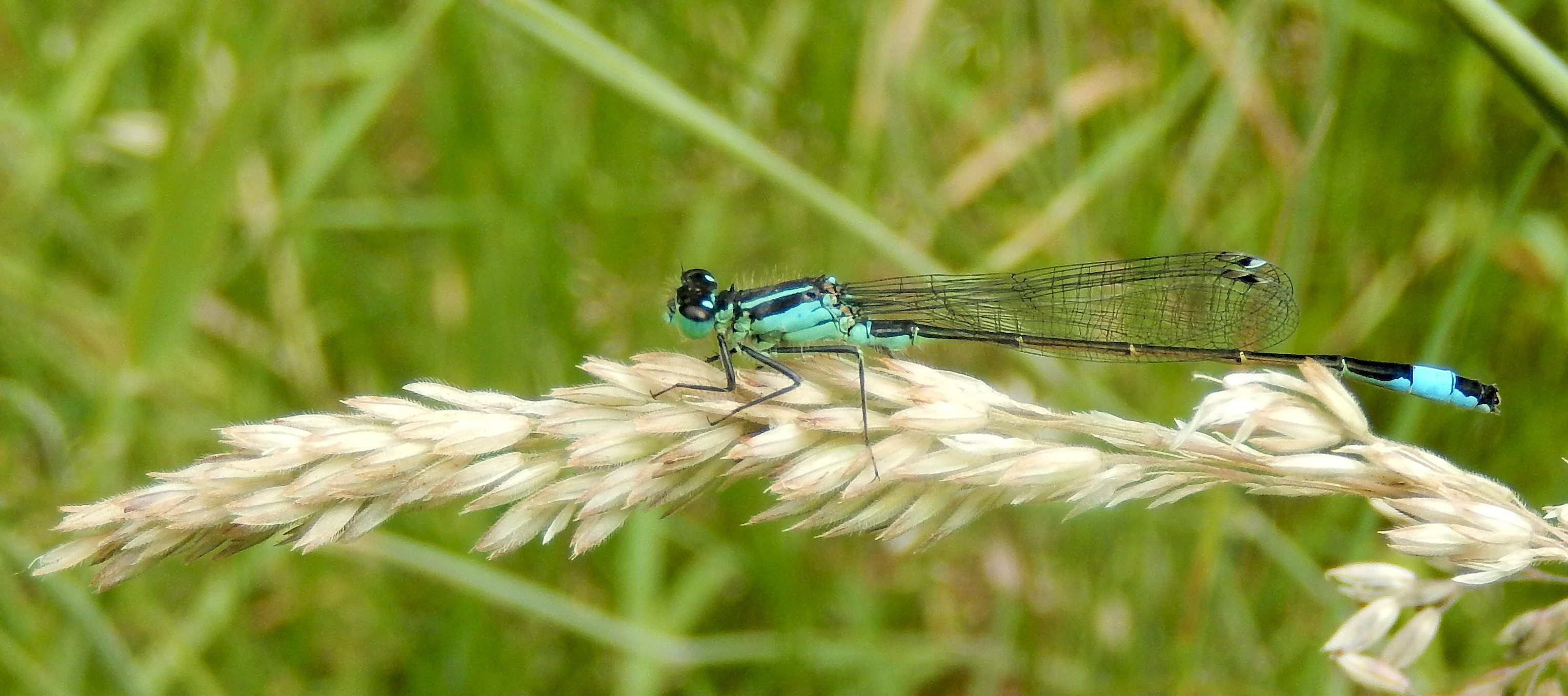
Bluetail damselfly, Ischnura elegans, on Yorkshire fog

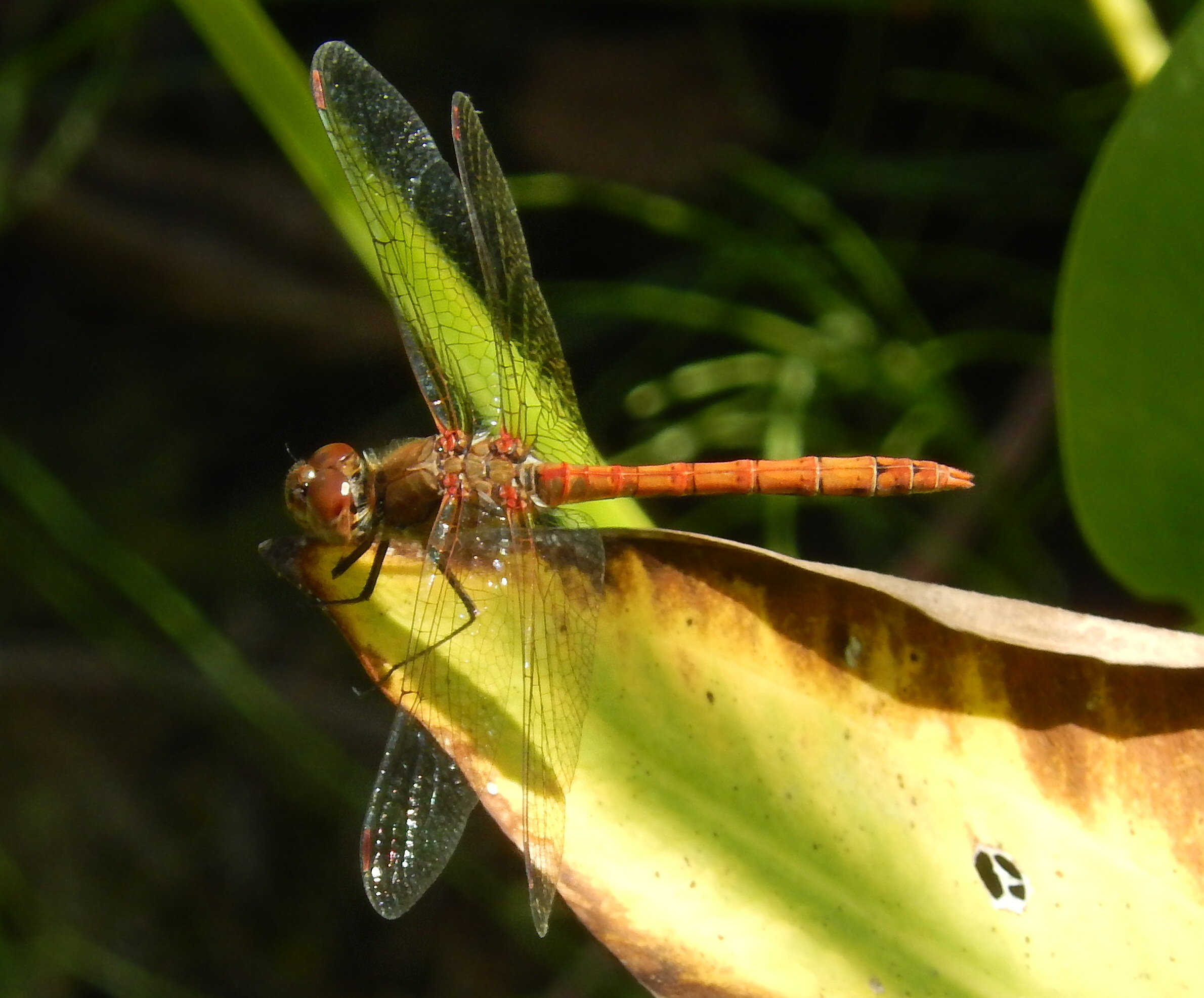
Male common darter, Sympetrum striolatum

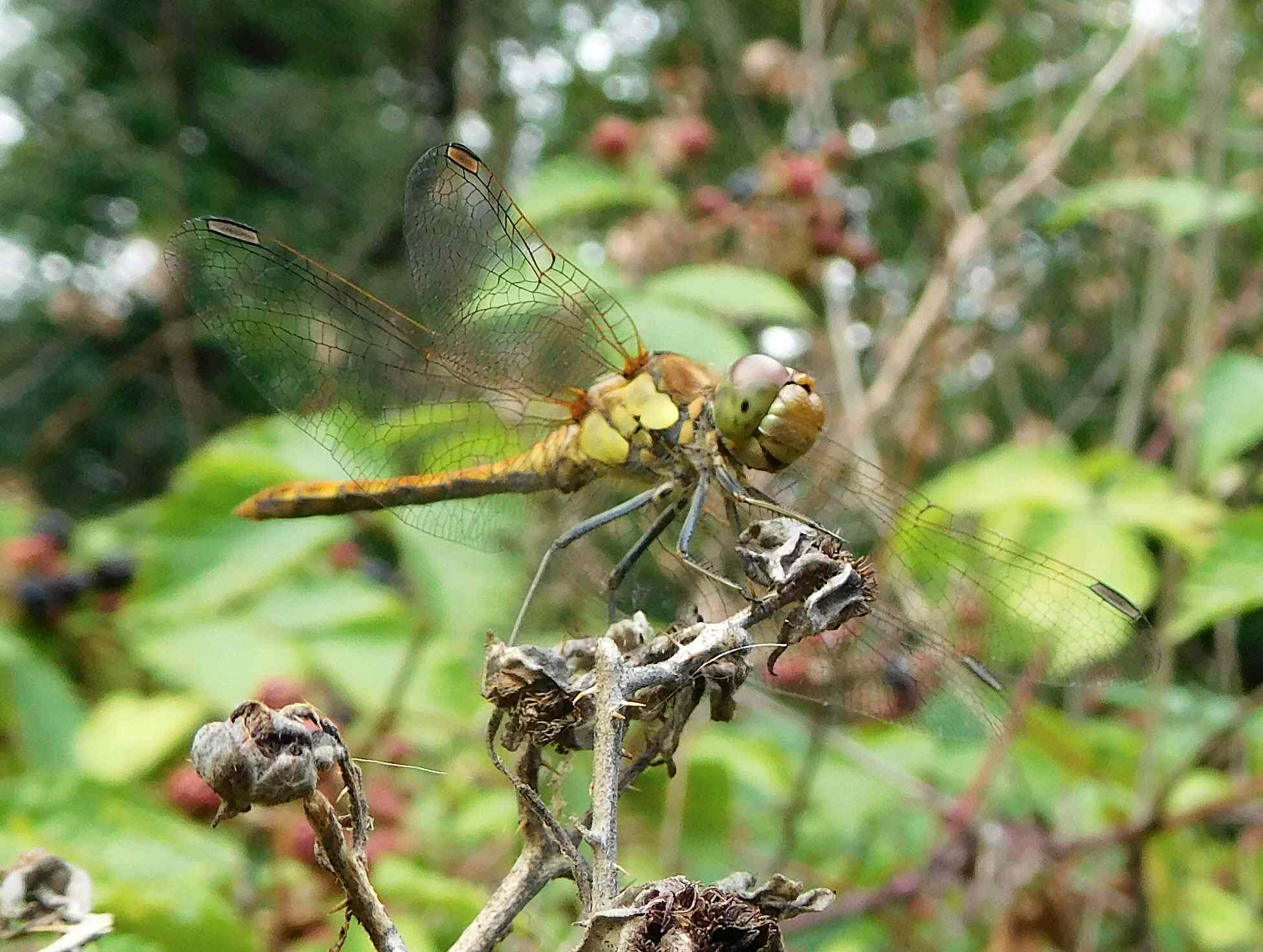
Immature female common darter

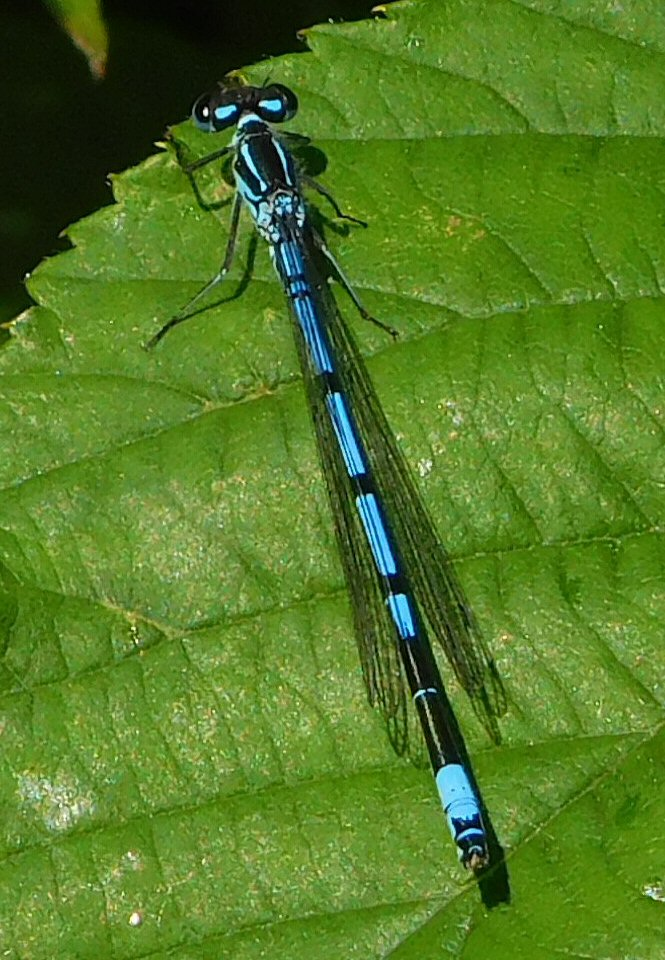
Azure damselfly, Coenagrion puella

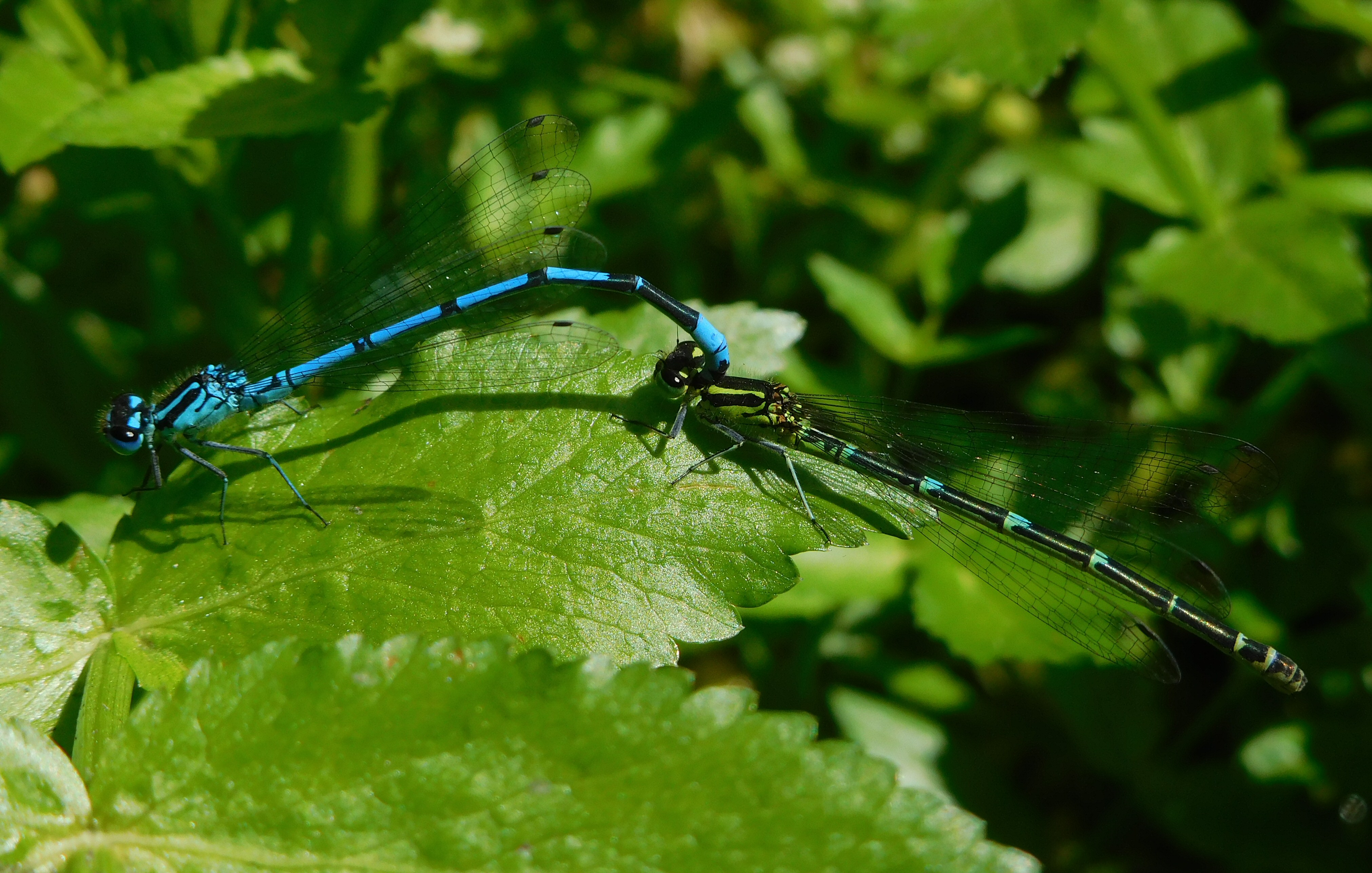
Pair of azure damselflies, Coenagrion puella, in cop

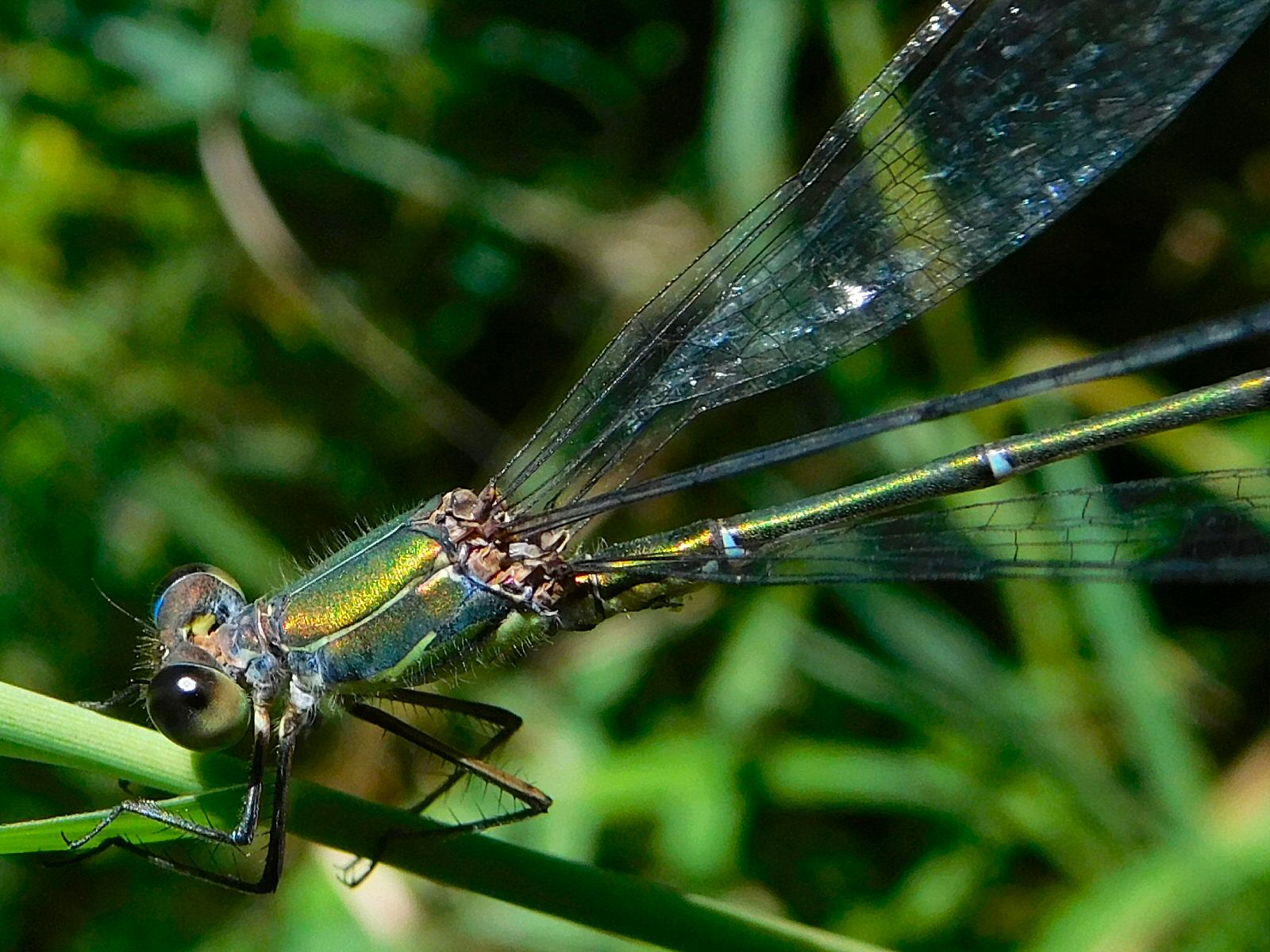
Willow emerald or spreadwing damselfly, Chalcolestes viridis, a recent arrival

Pond life
Pond life

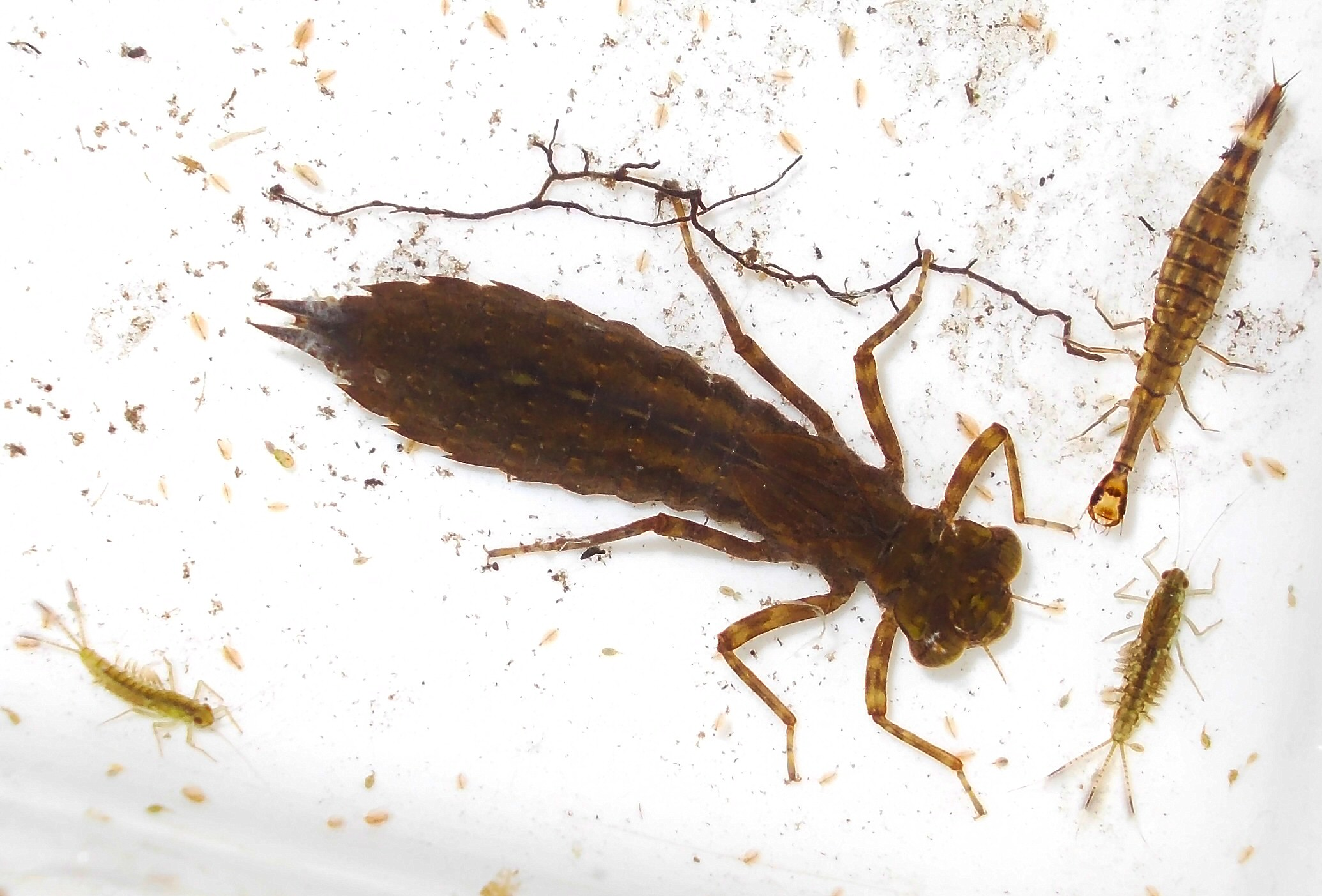
Dragonfly nymph, beetle larva (right), mayfly nymphs, water fleas in a pond dipping tray

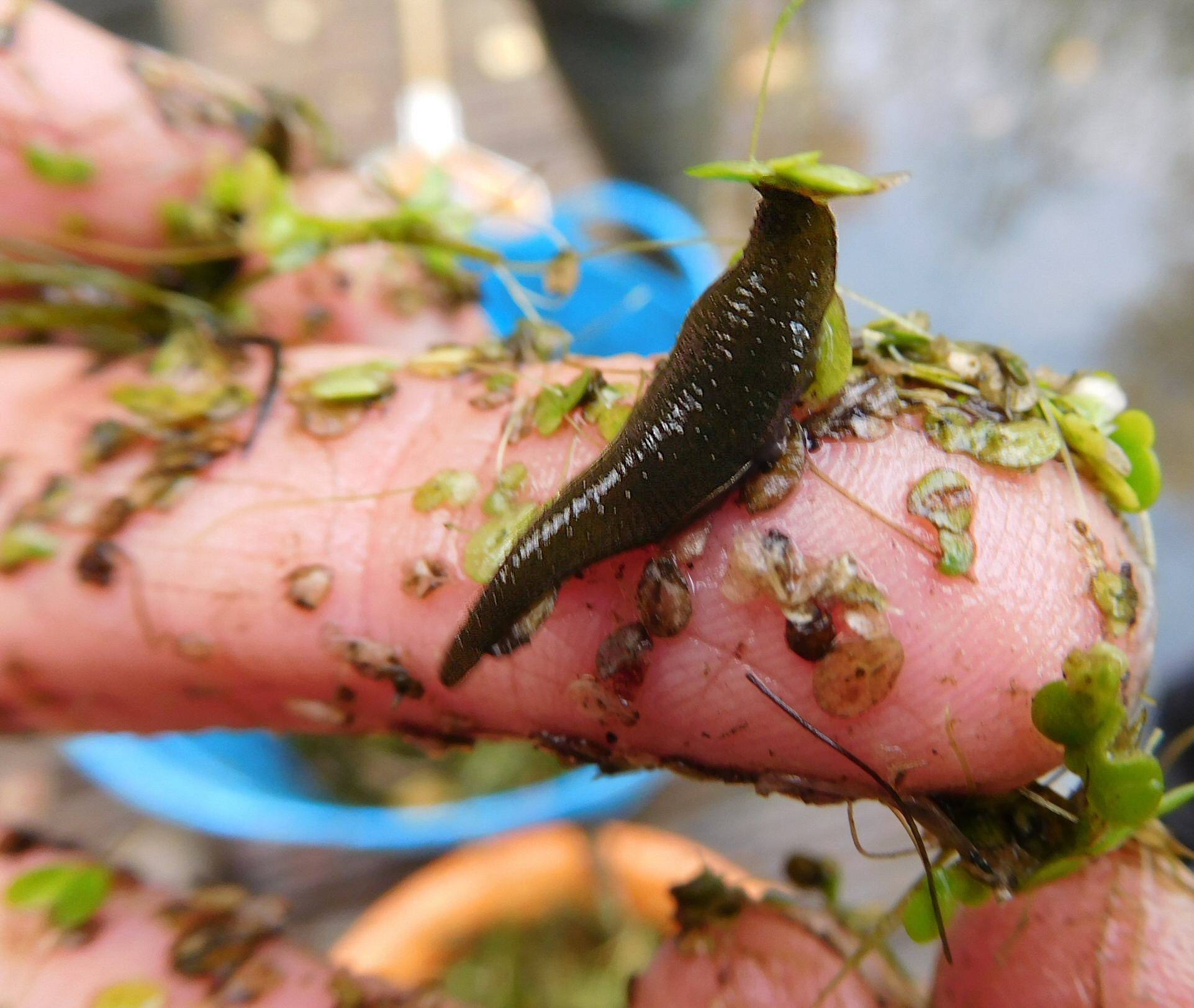
Leech

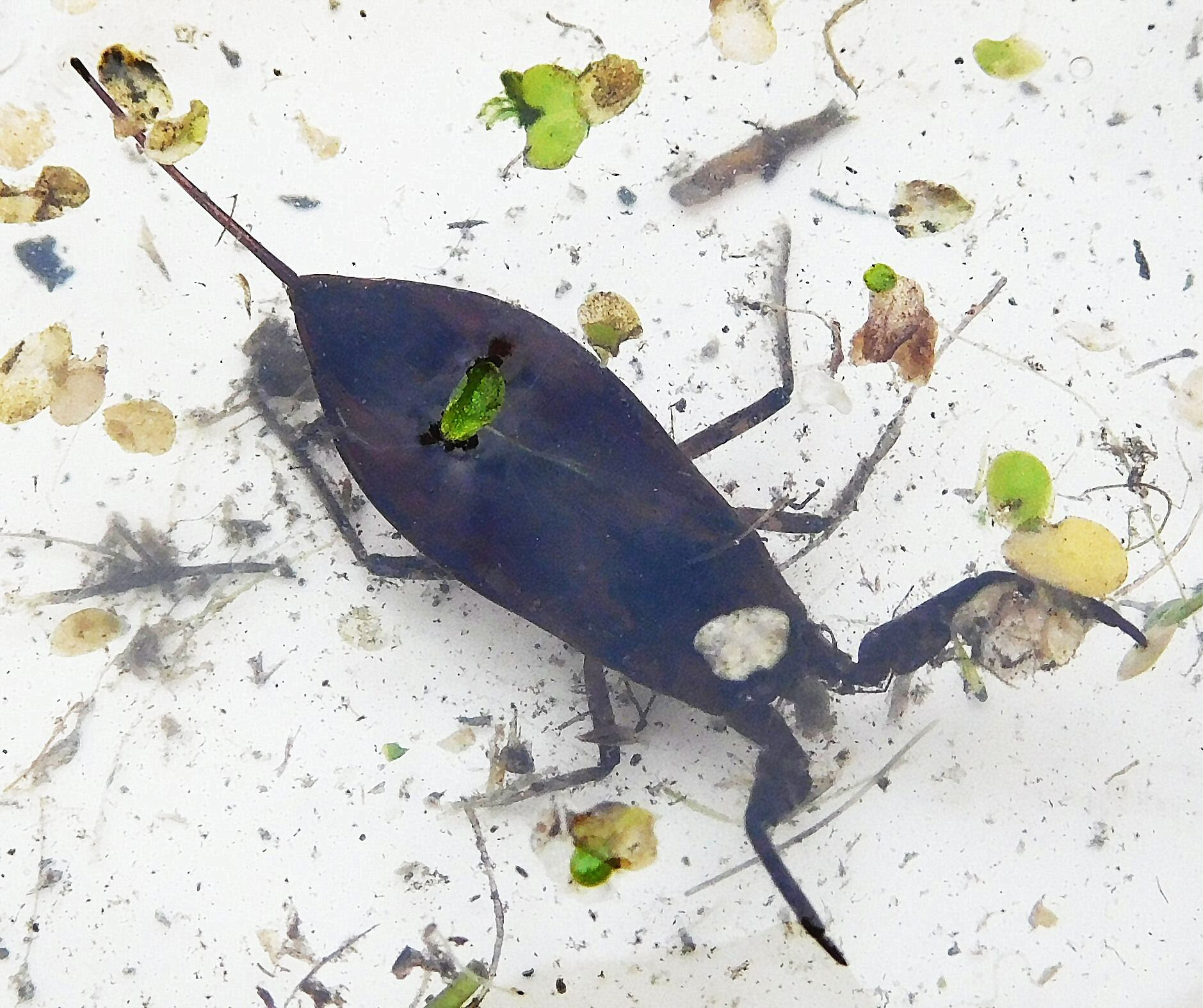
Water scorpion

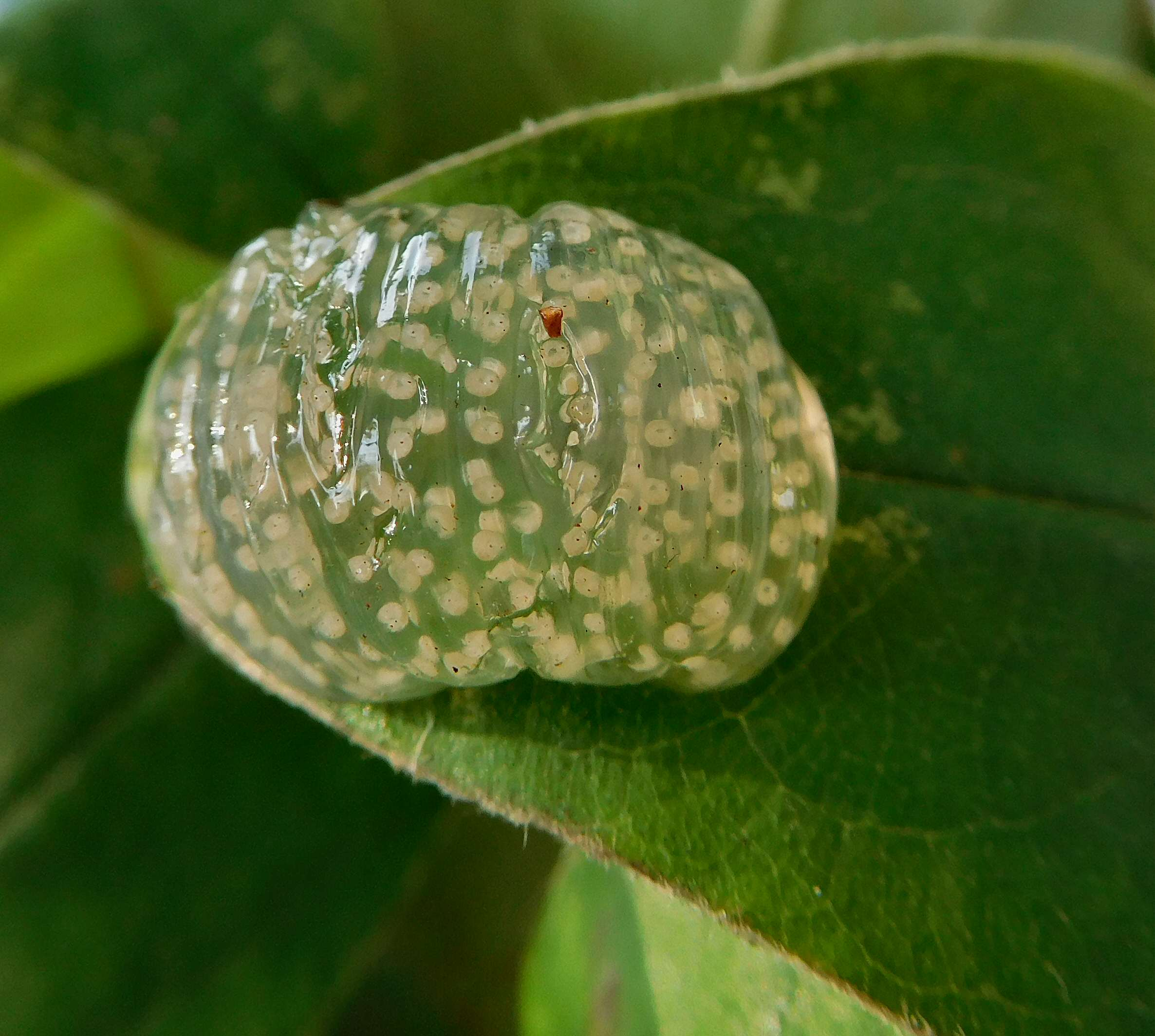
Caddisfly egg mass on leaf away from the pond

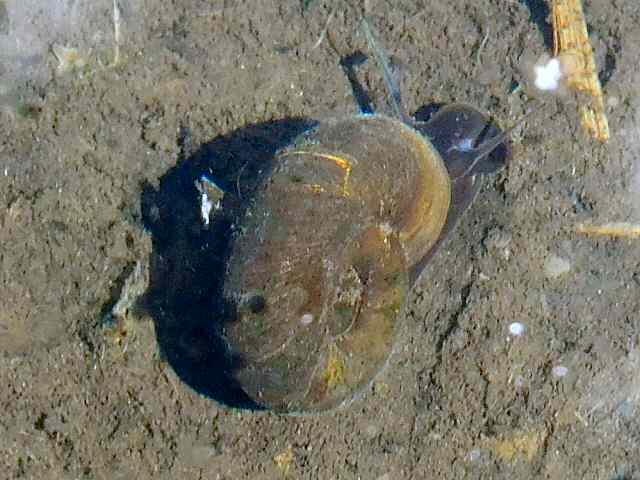
Great ramshorn snail crawling on muddy bottom

Other arthropods
Other arthropods

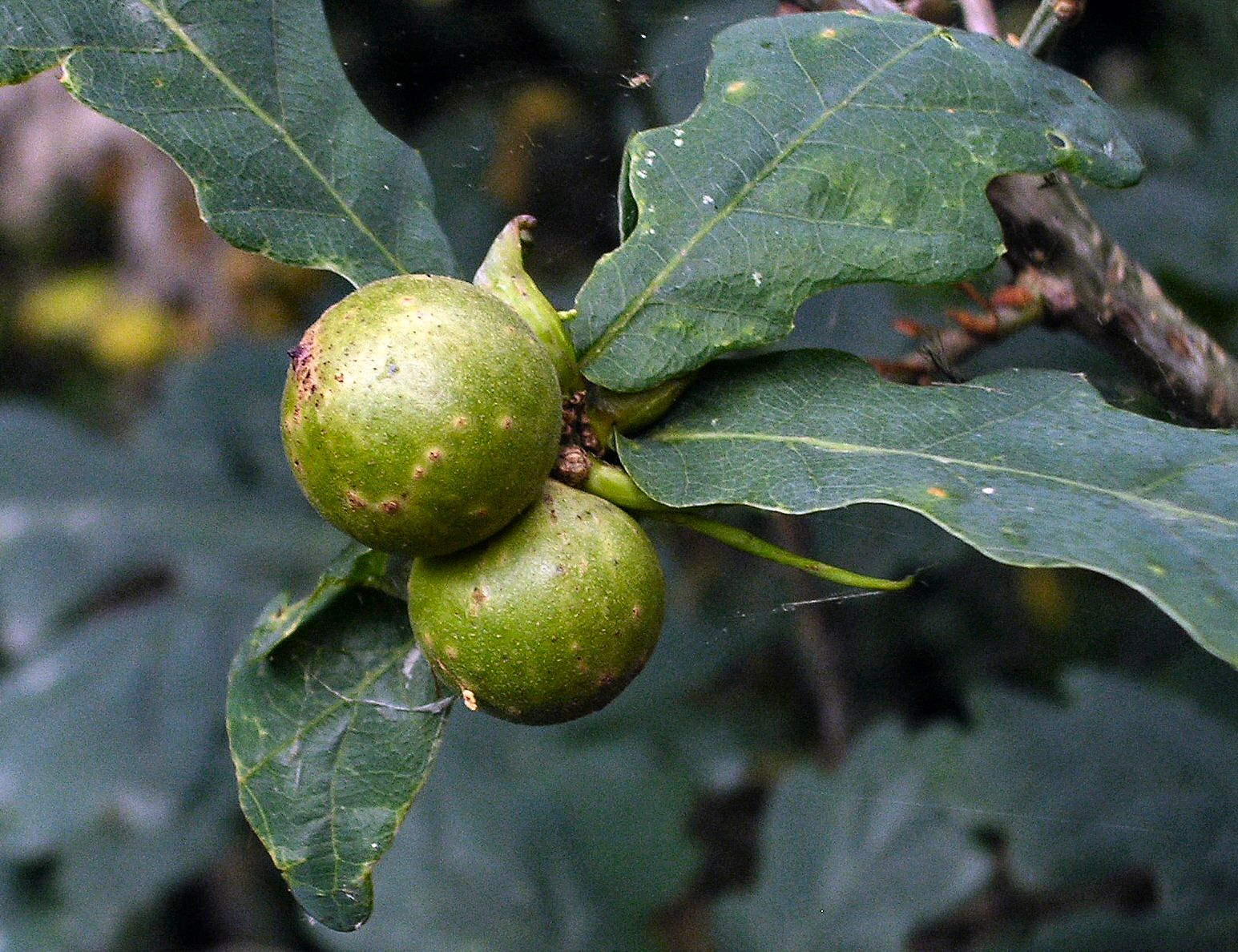
Marble galls of gall wasp, Andricus kollari

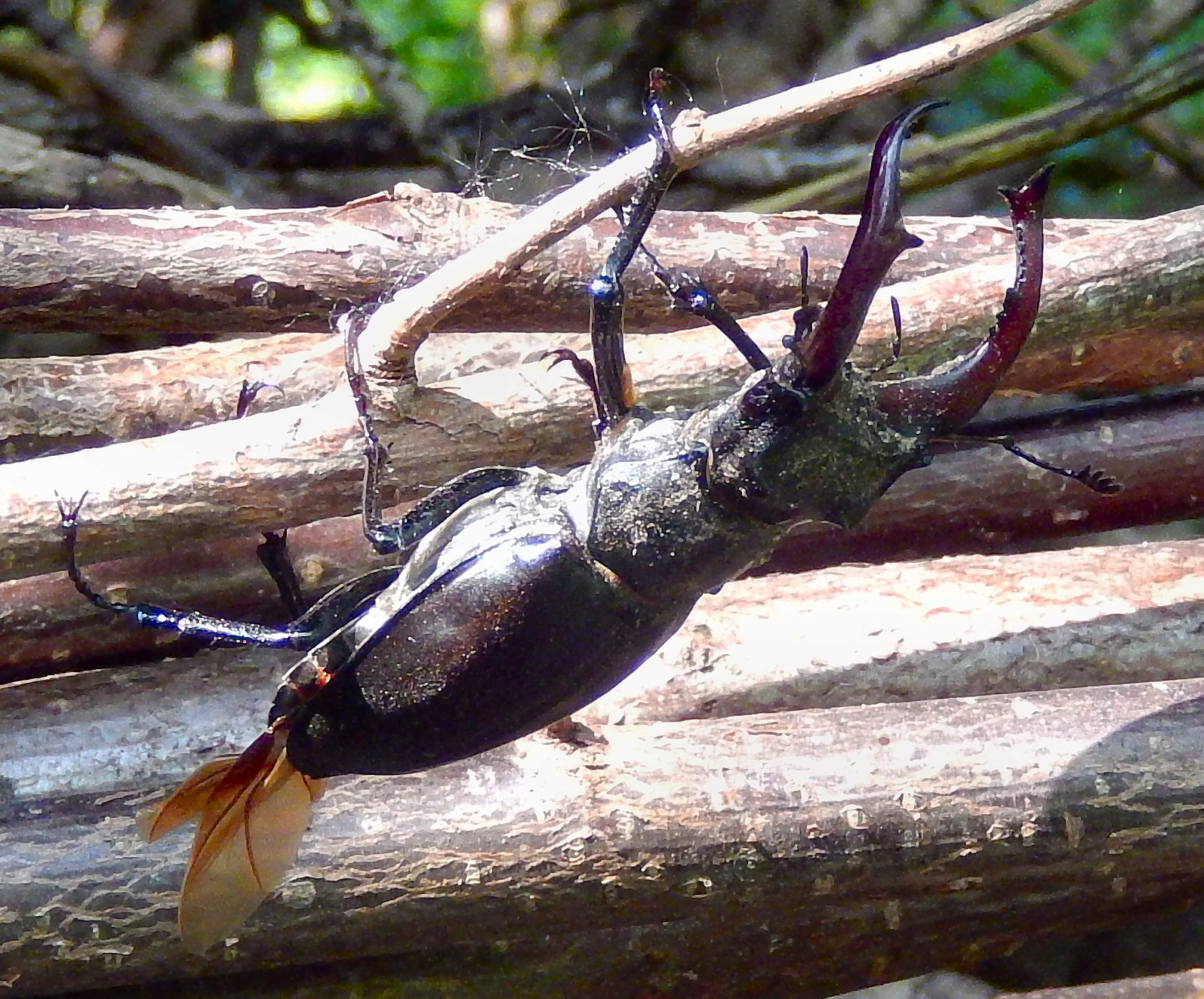
Stag beetle, Lucanus cervus, on deadhedge

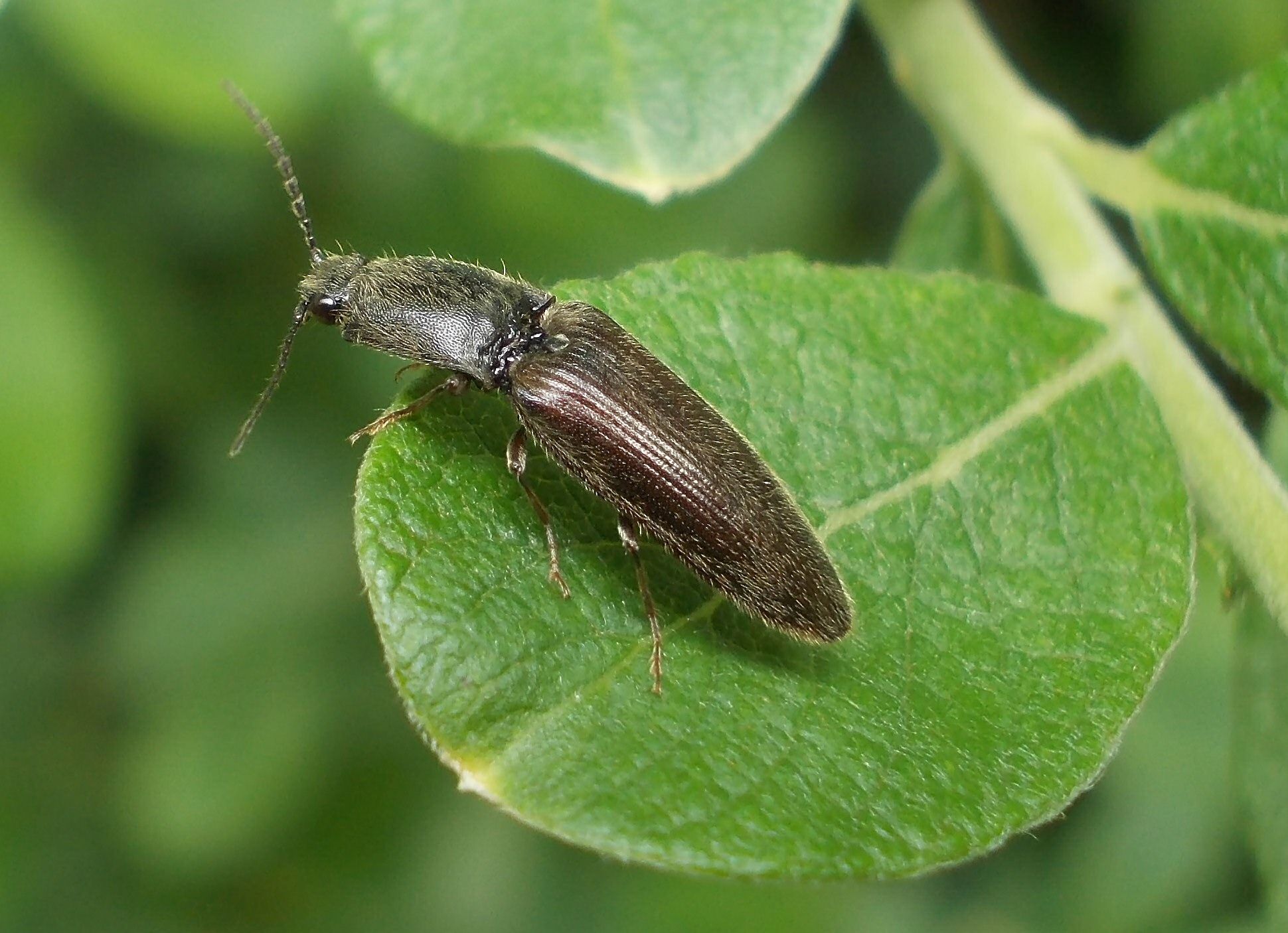
Click beetle, Athous haemorrhoidalis, on sallow

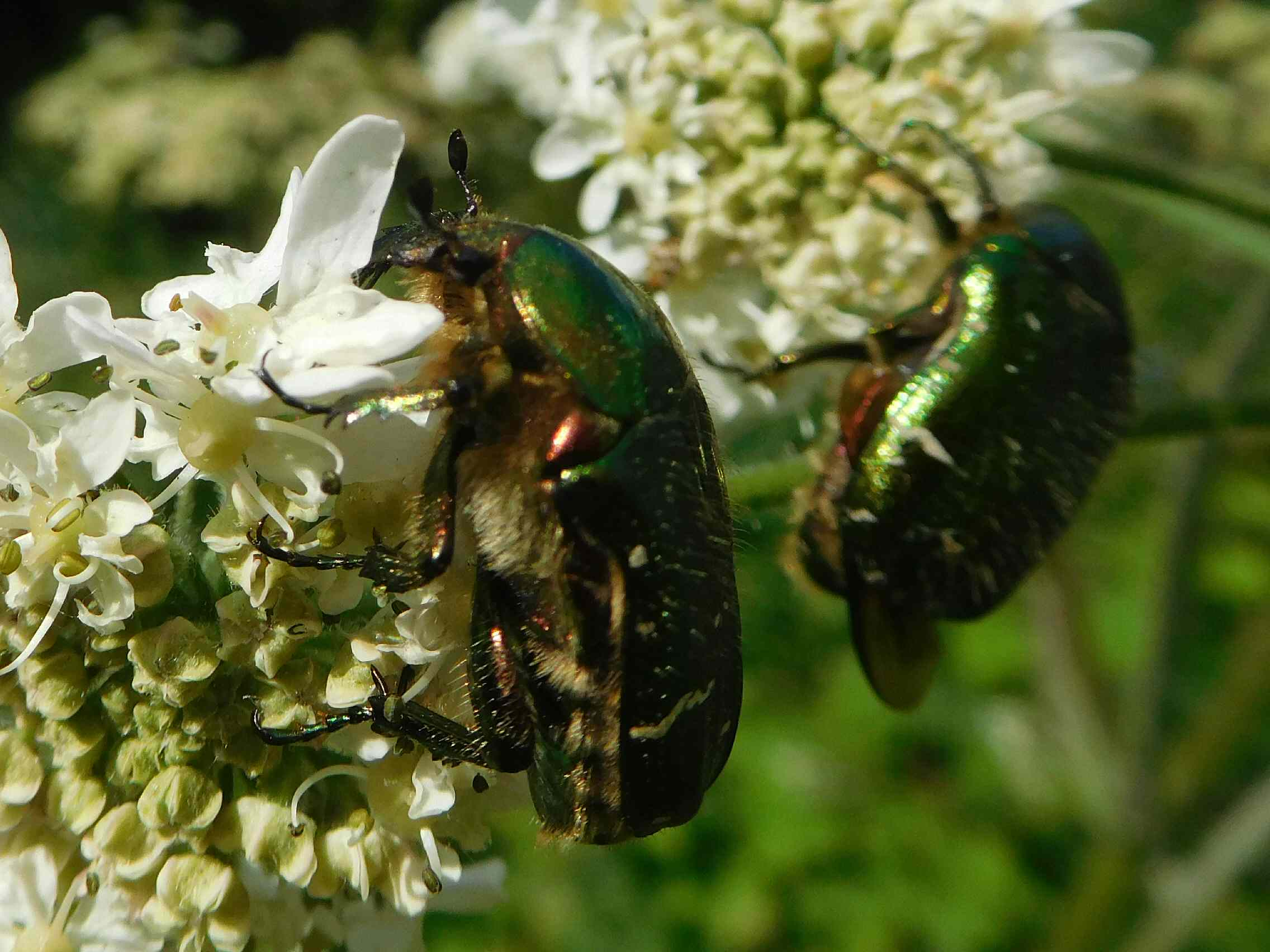
Rose chafer beetles, Cetonia aurata, on hogweed, Heracleum sphondylium

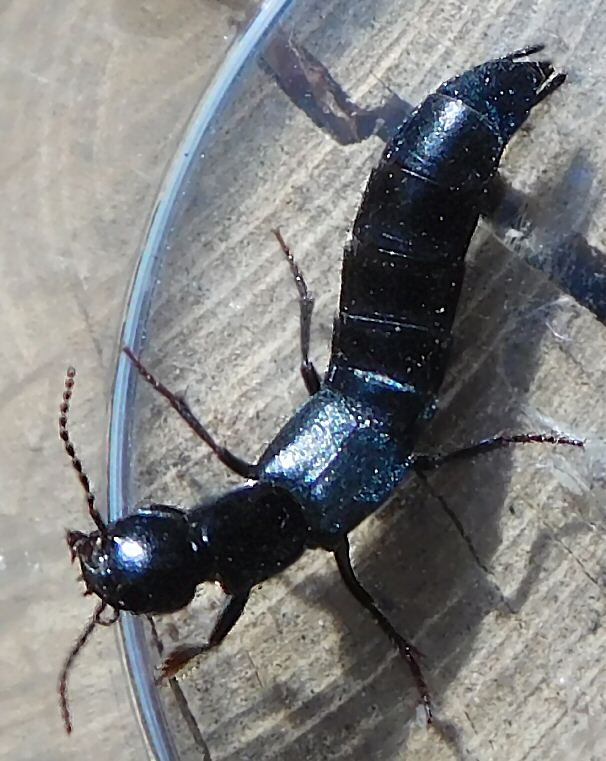
Devil's coach horse beetle (Staphylinidae)

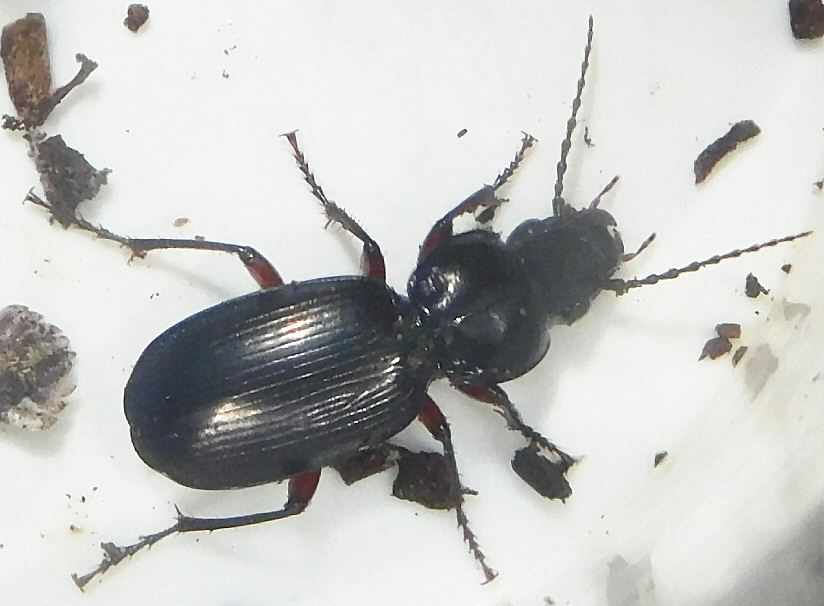
Carabid ground beetle, Pterostichus cf. madidus

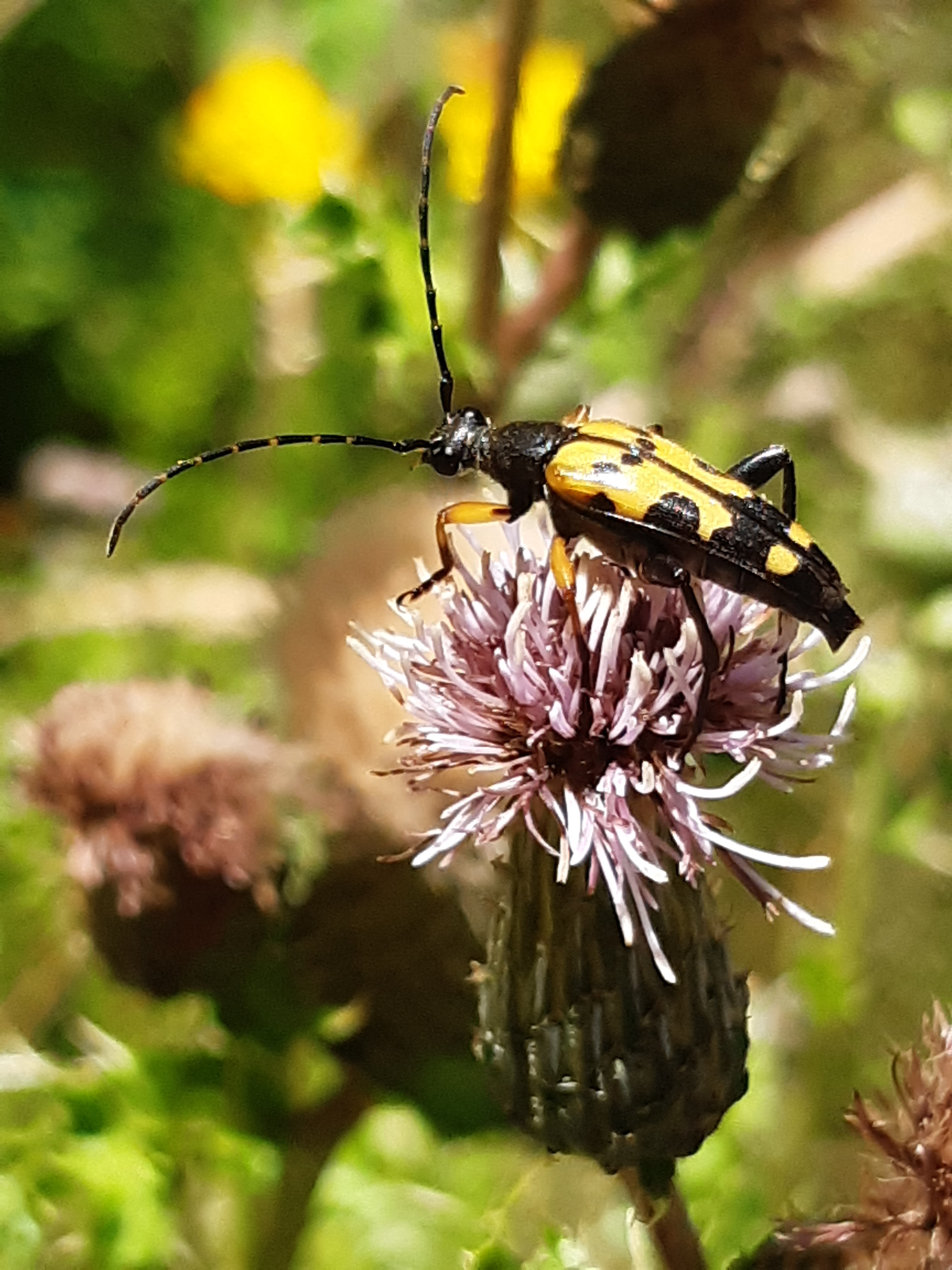
Wasp Mimic Beetle Rutpela maculata in Small Meadow

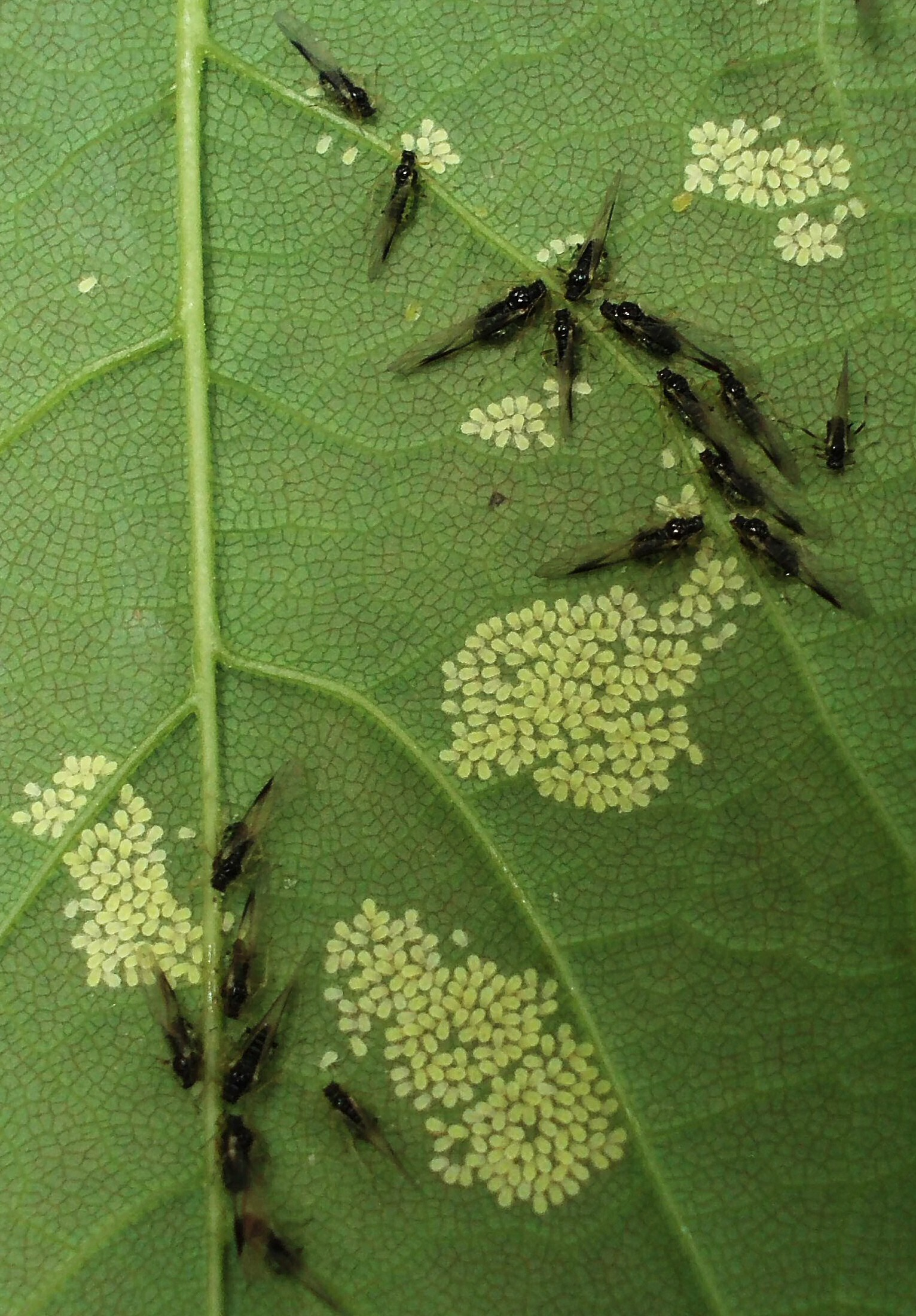
Aphids and live young on sycamore

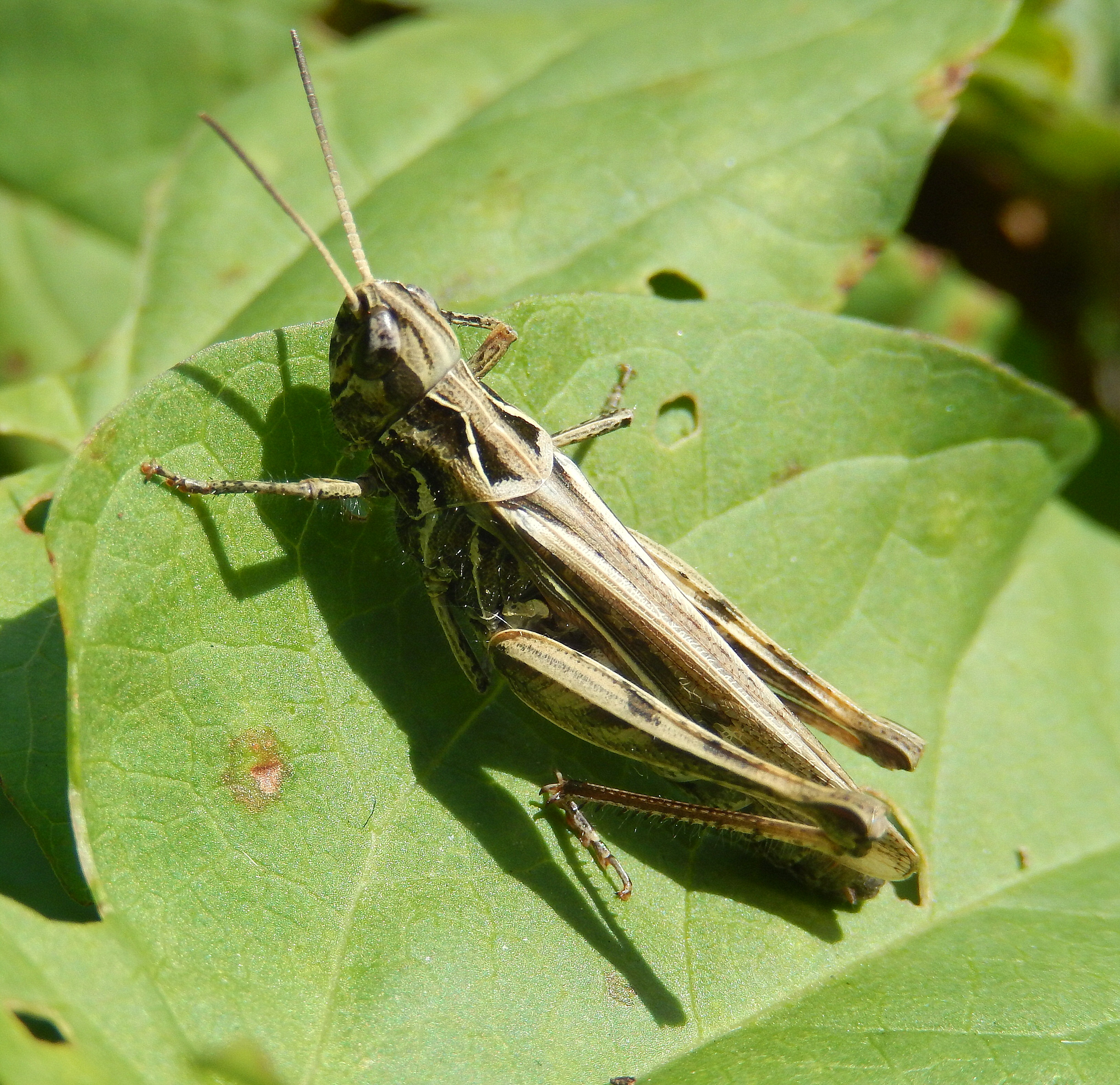
Field grasshopper, Chorthippus brunneus, in ramp meadow

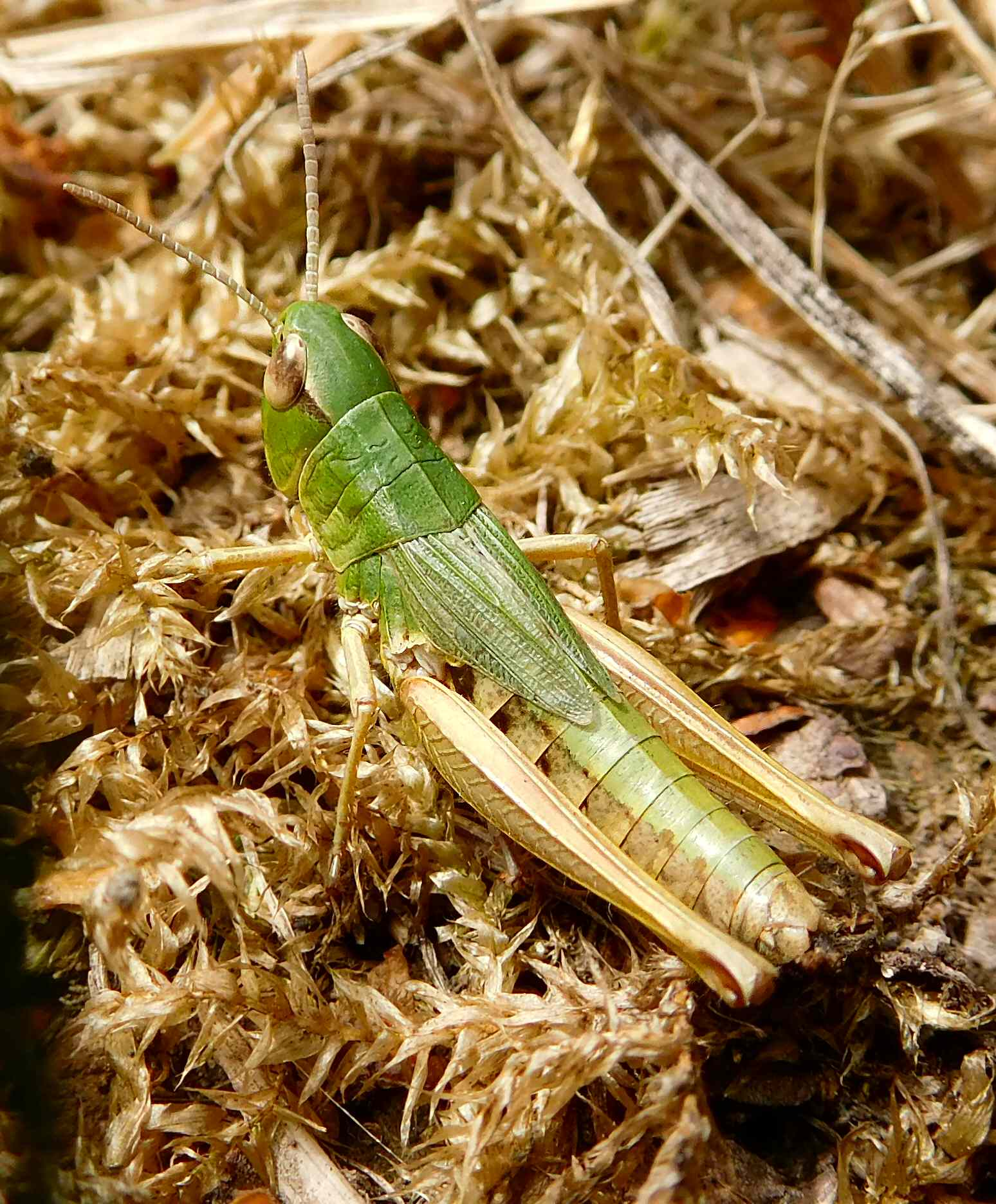
Meadow grasshopper, Chorthippus parallelus, in anthill meadow

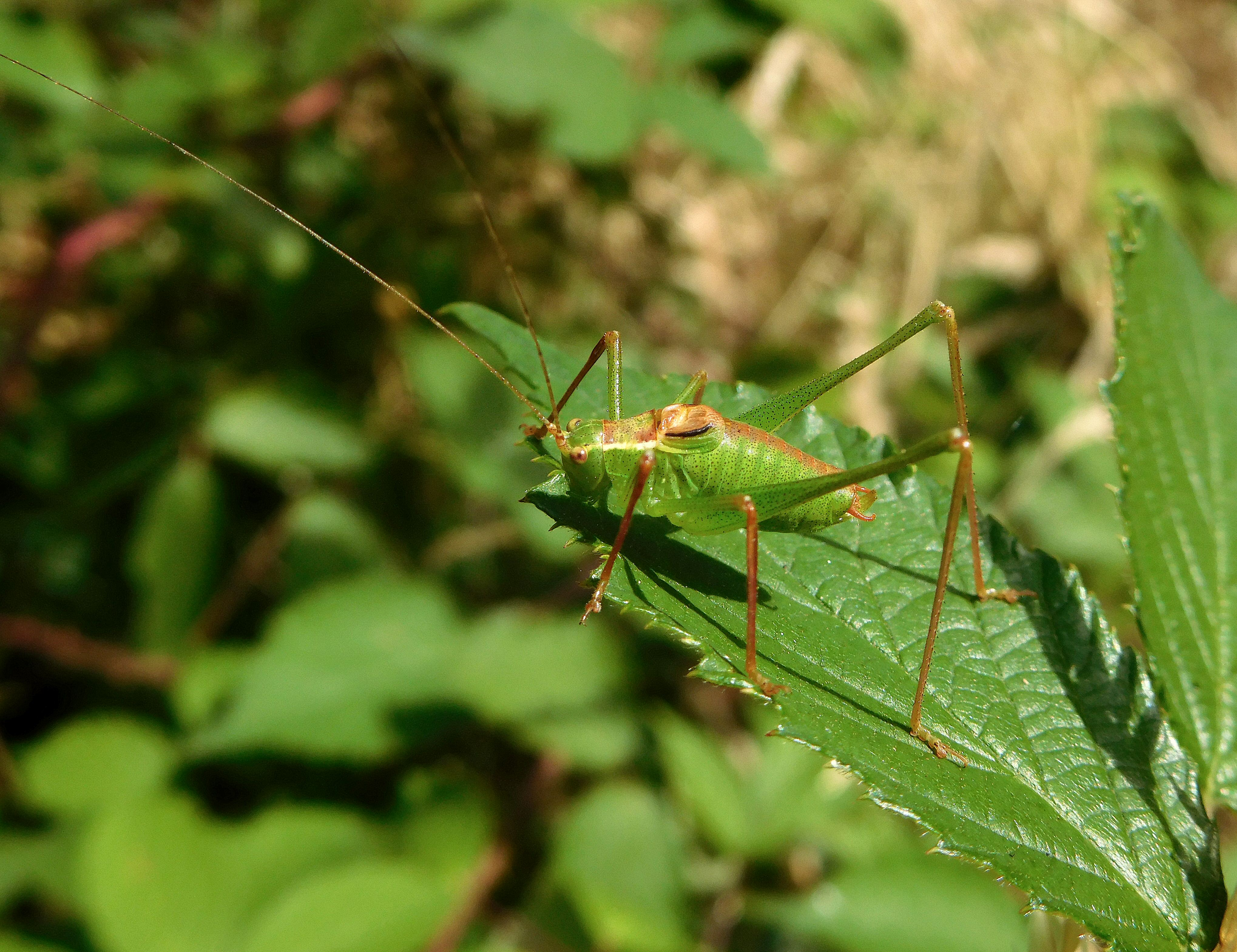
Speckled bush cricket, Leptophyes punctatissima, in picnic meadow

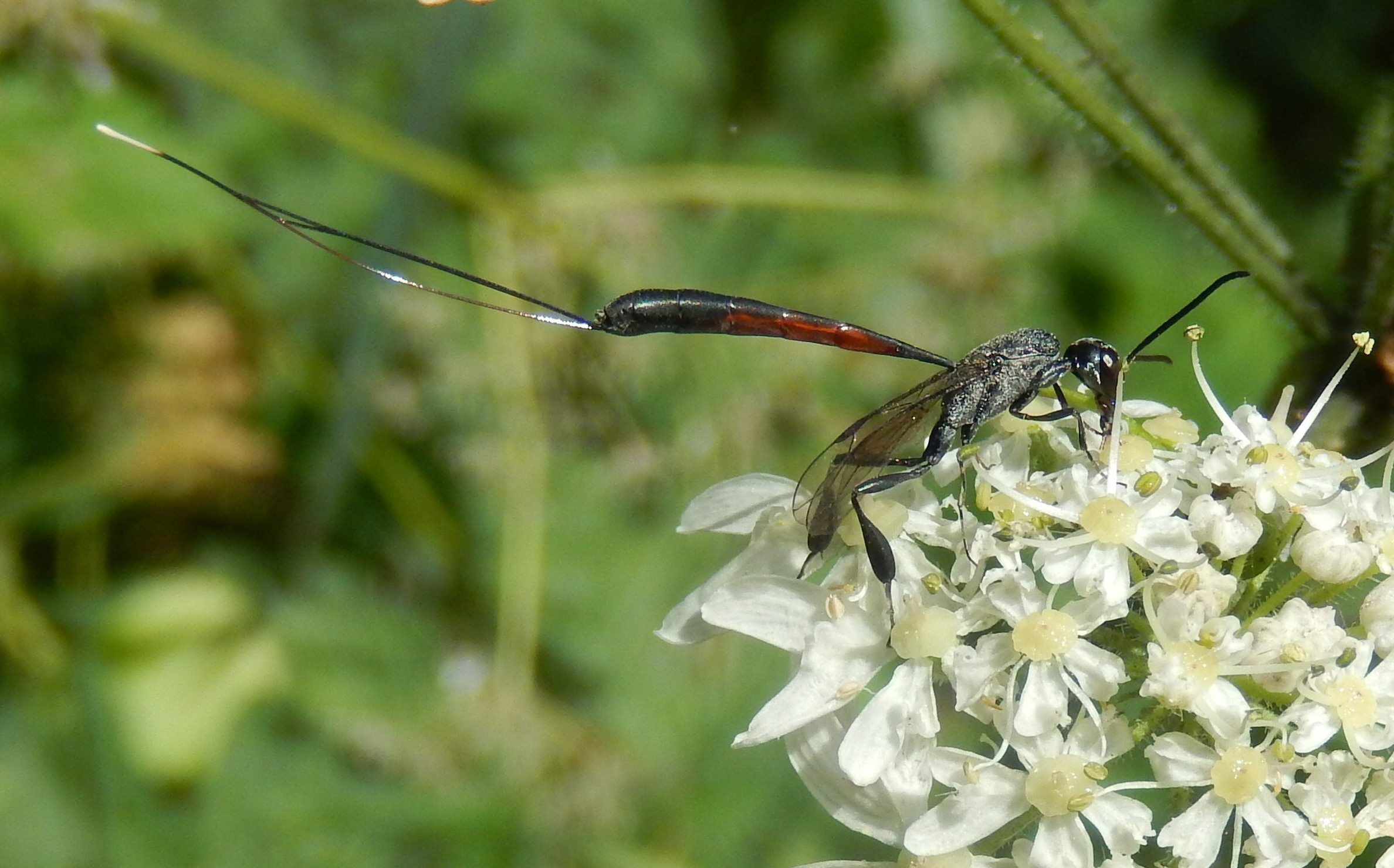
Ichneumon wasp, Gasteruption jaculator, nectaring on hogweed

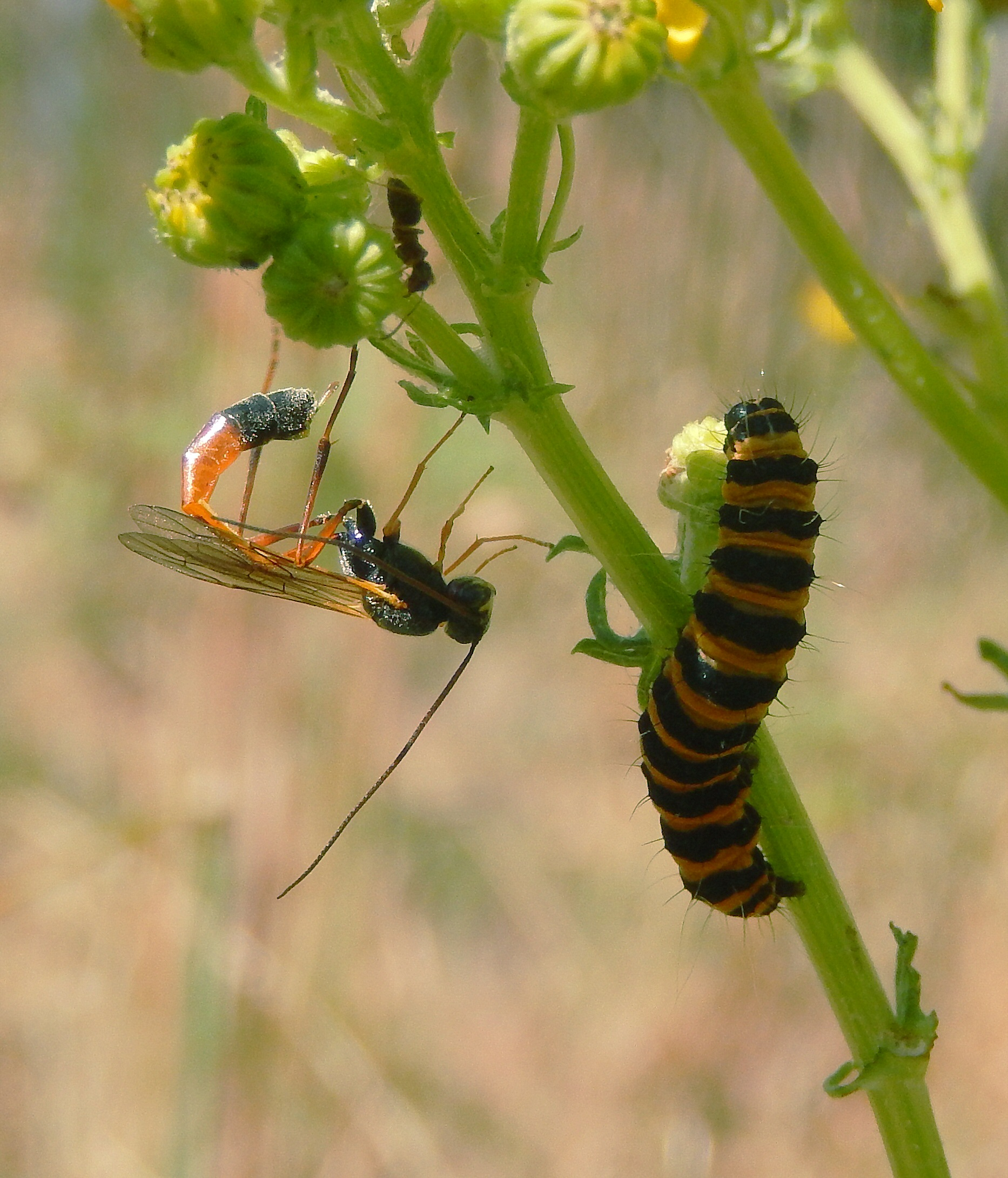
Parasitoid wasp (Ichneumonidae) and its host, a cinnabar moth larva, in which it has just laid an egg

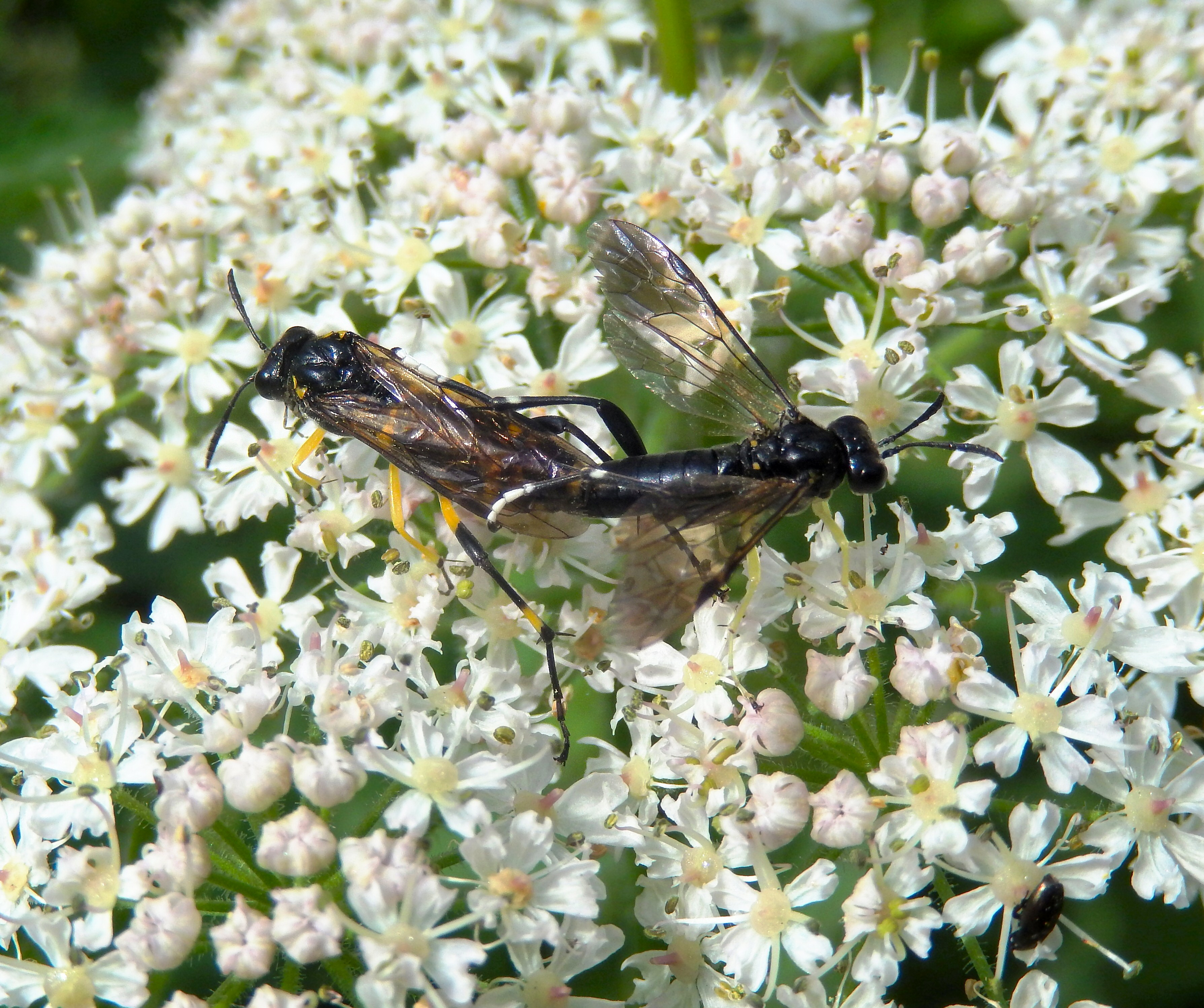
Macrophya sawflies (Symphyta) mating on hogweed

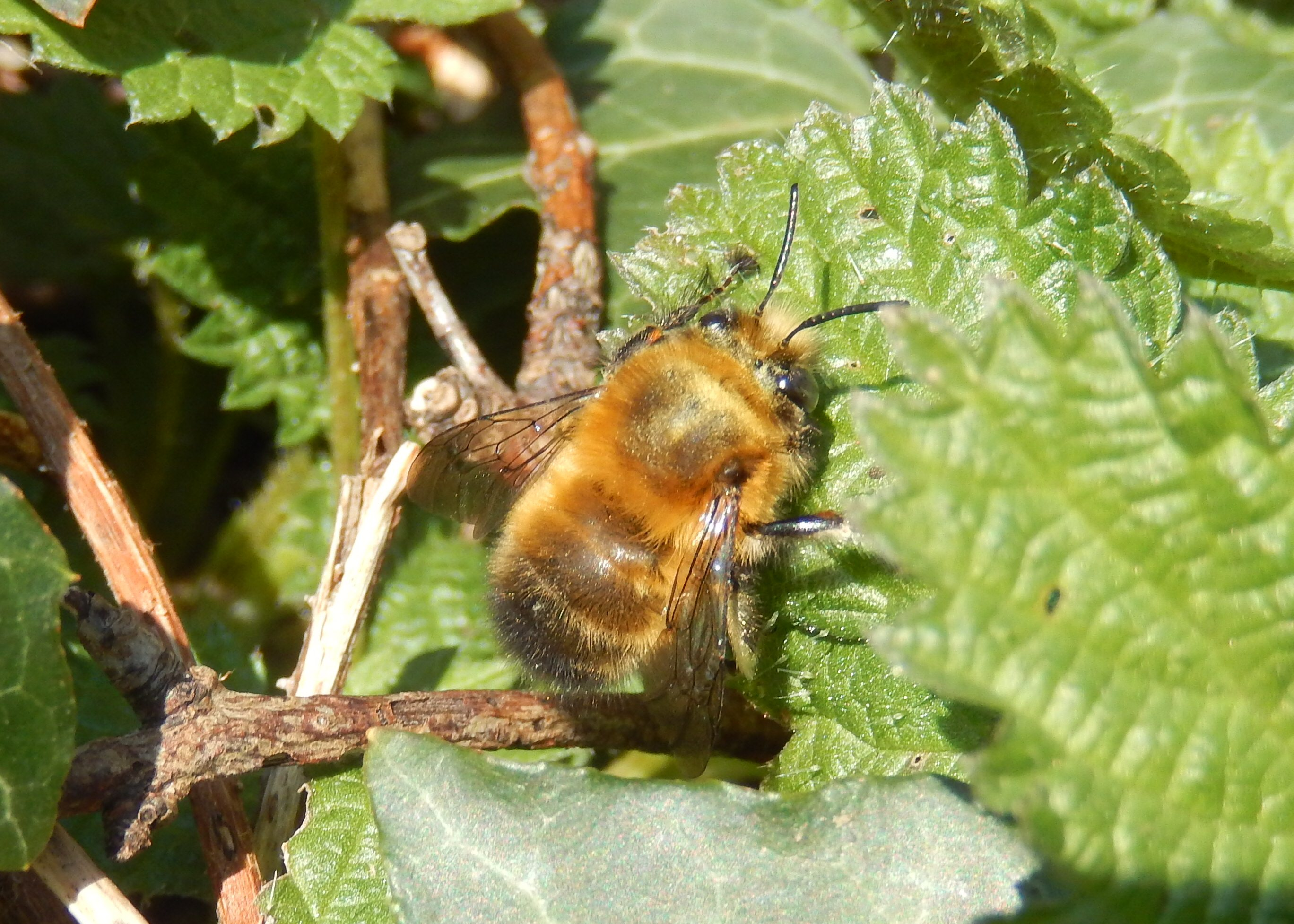
Male hairy-footed flower bee, Anthophora plumipes

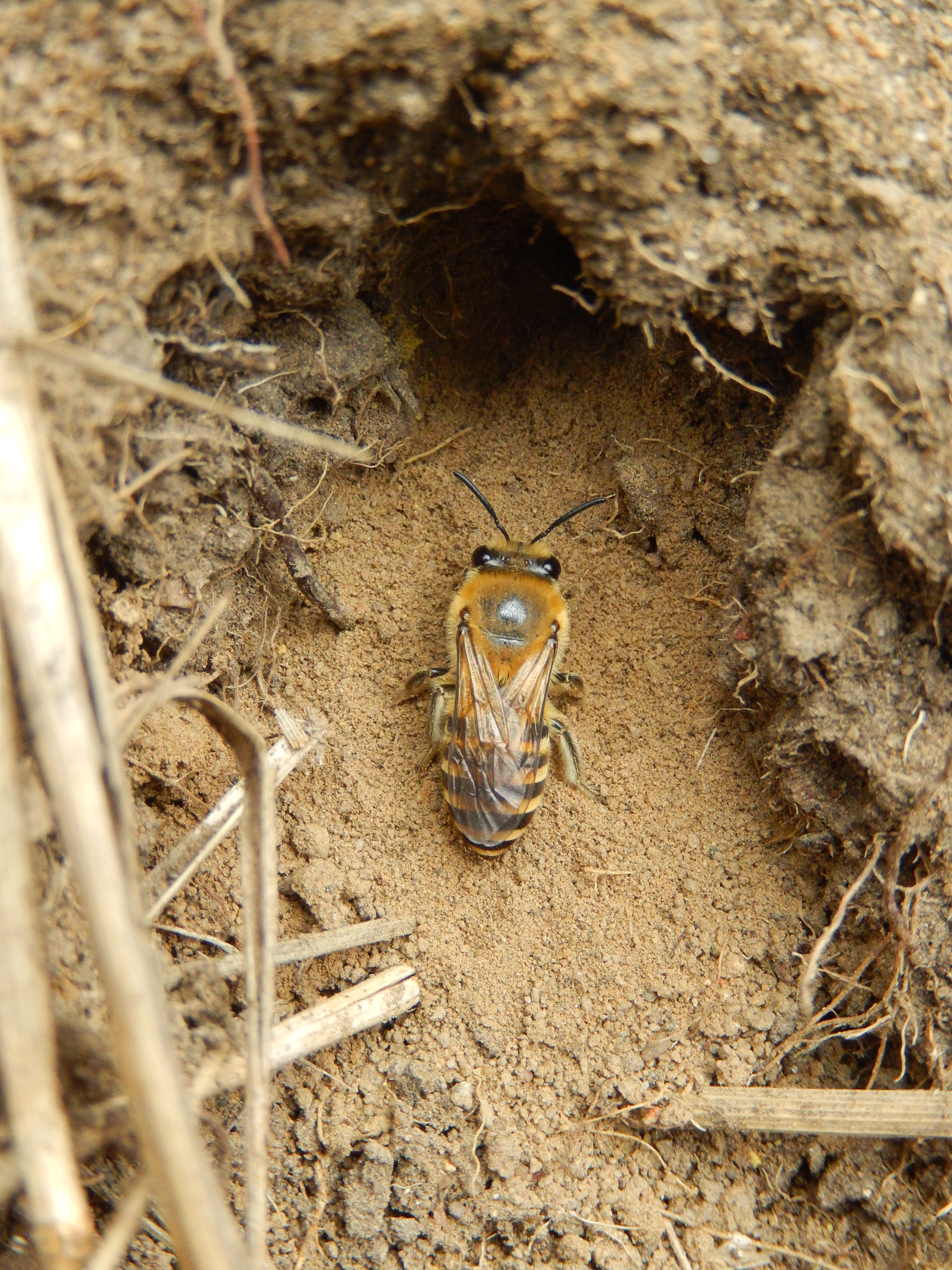
Female ivy bee, Colletes hederae, by her nest burrow

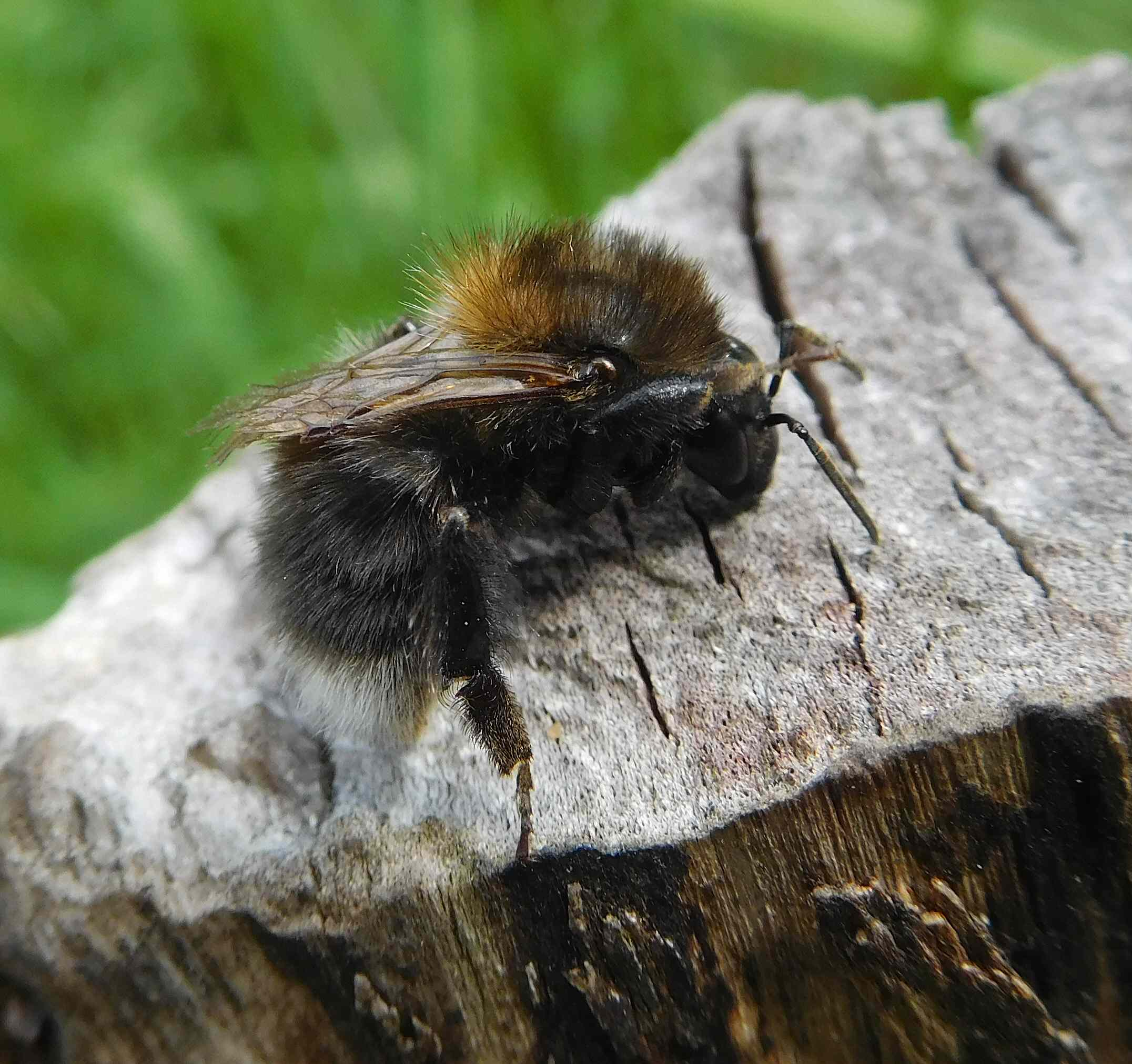
Common carder bee, Bombus pascuorum on loggery

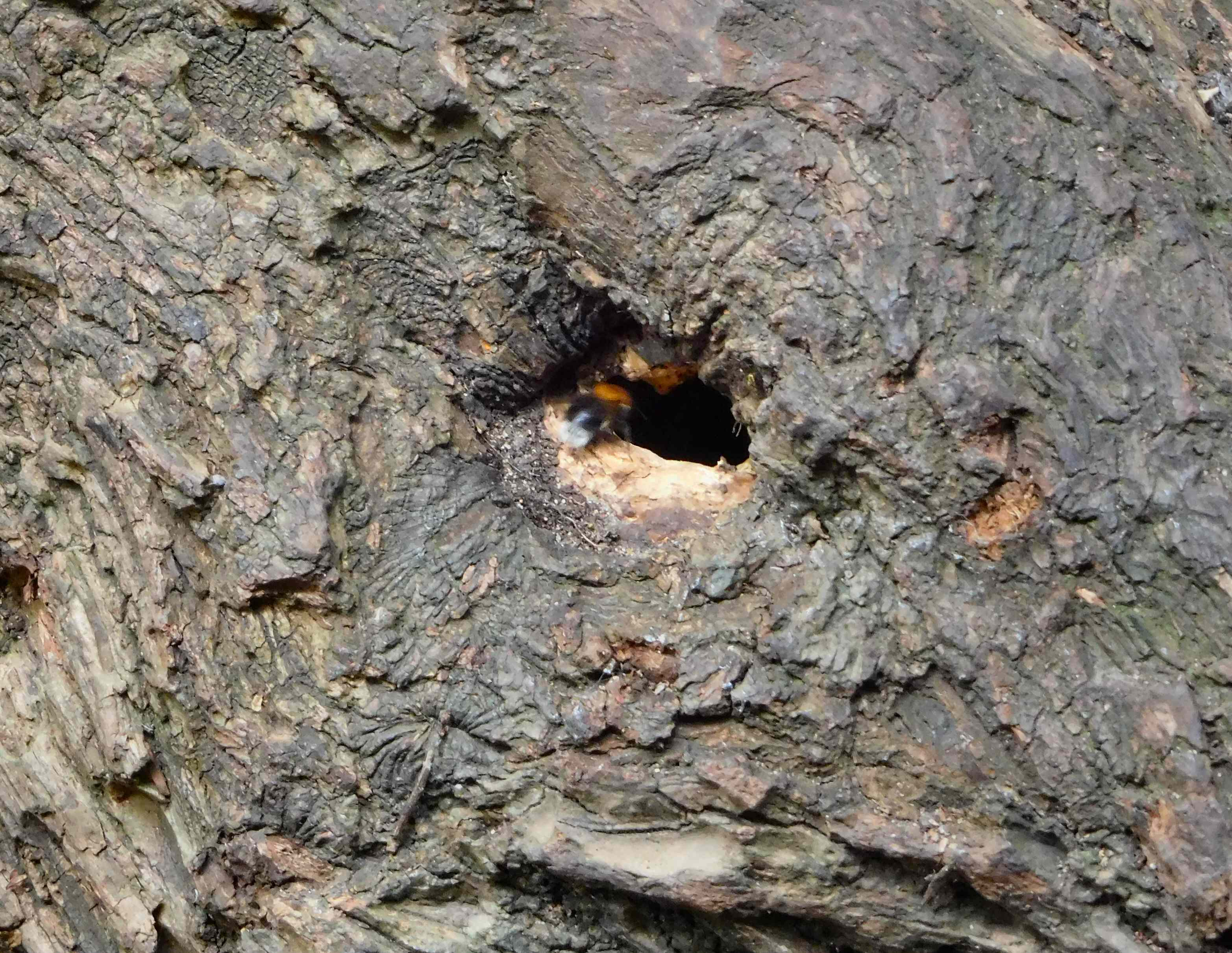
Tree bumblebee, Bombus hypnorum nest in fallen willow tree

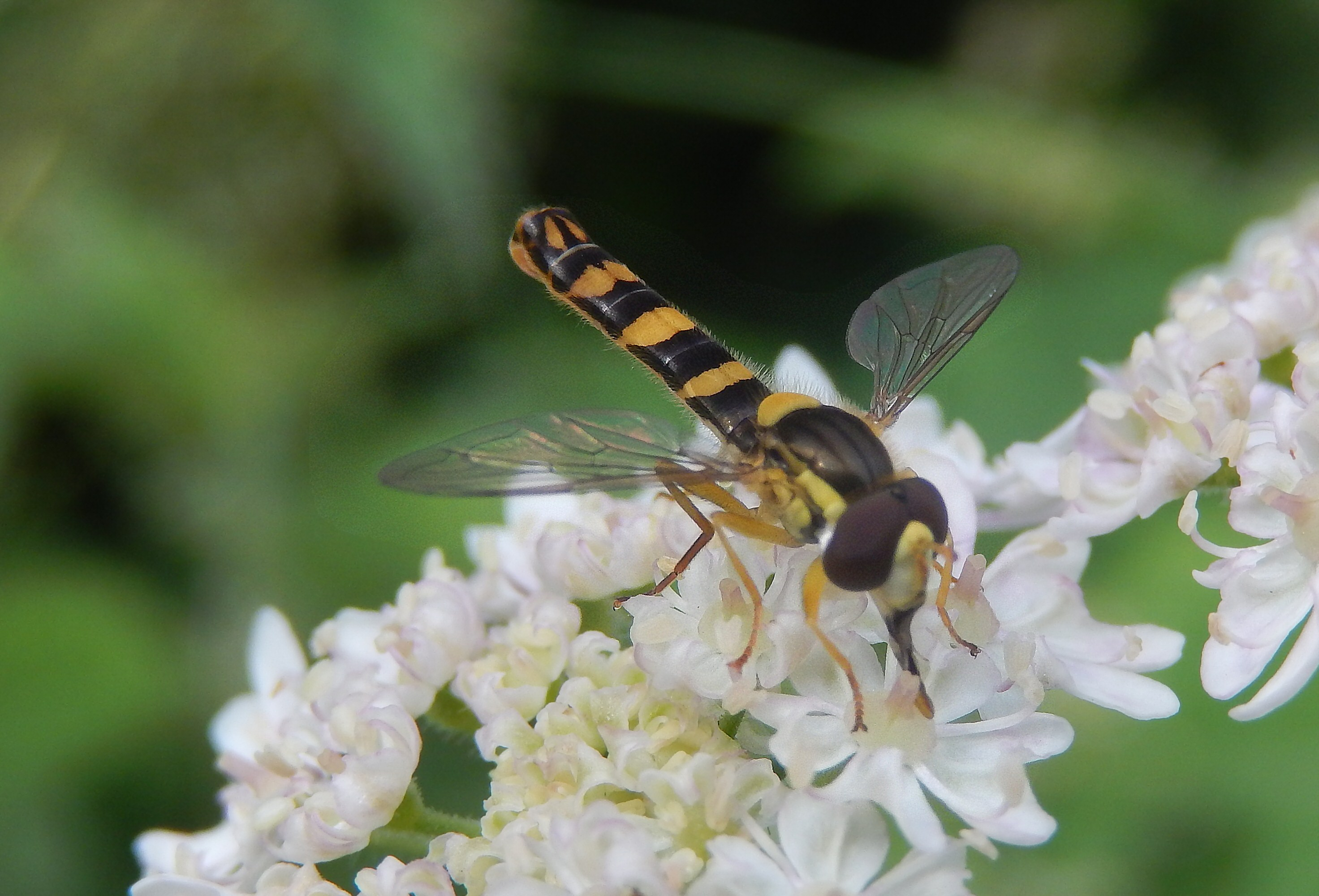
Male long hoverfly, Sphaerophoria scripta

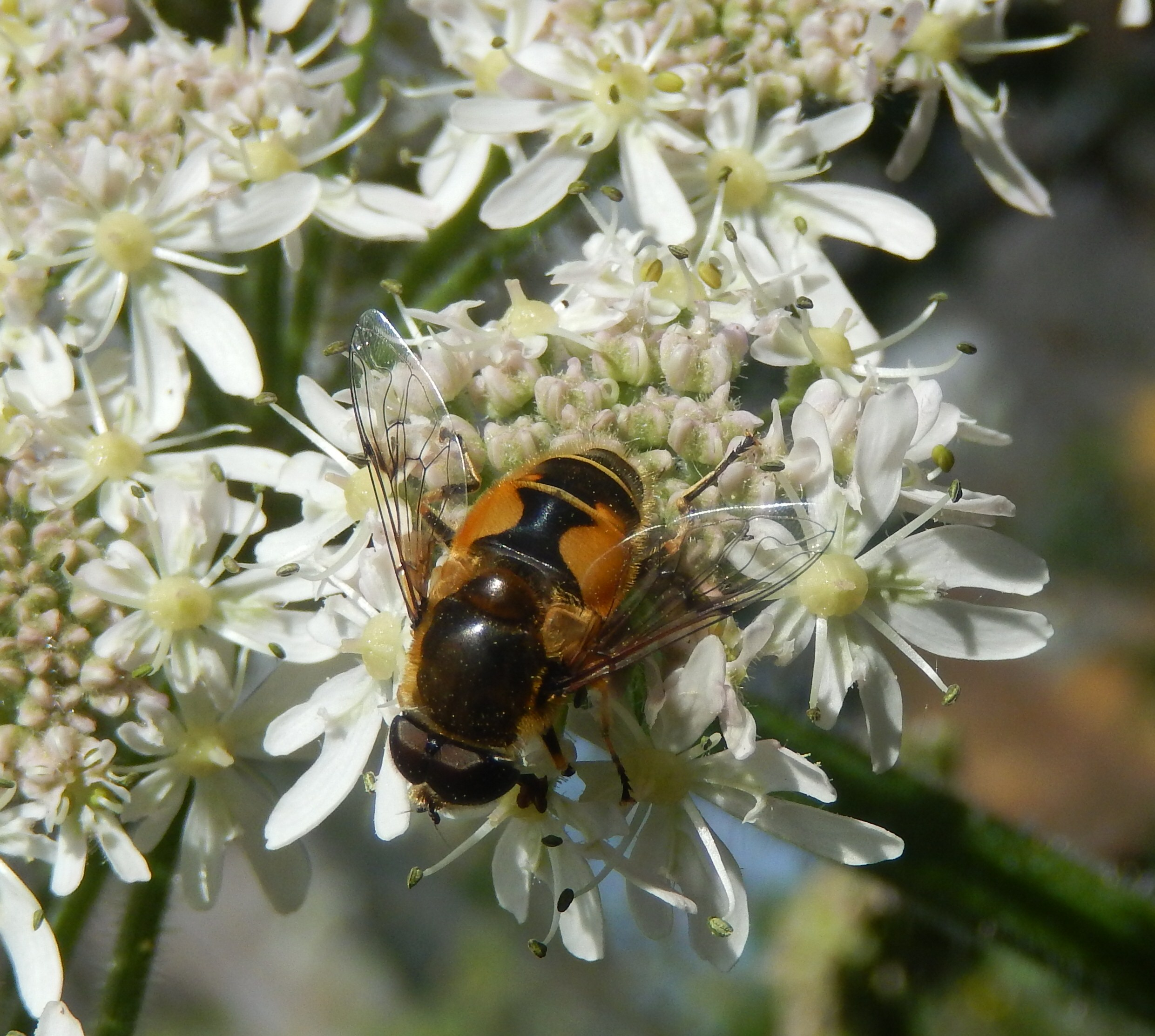
Hoverfly Eristalis horticola

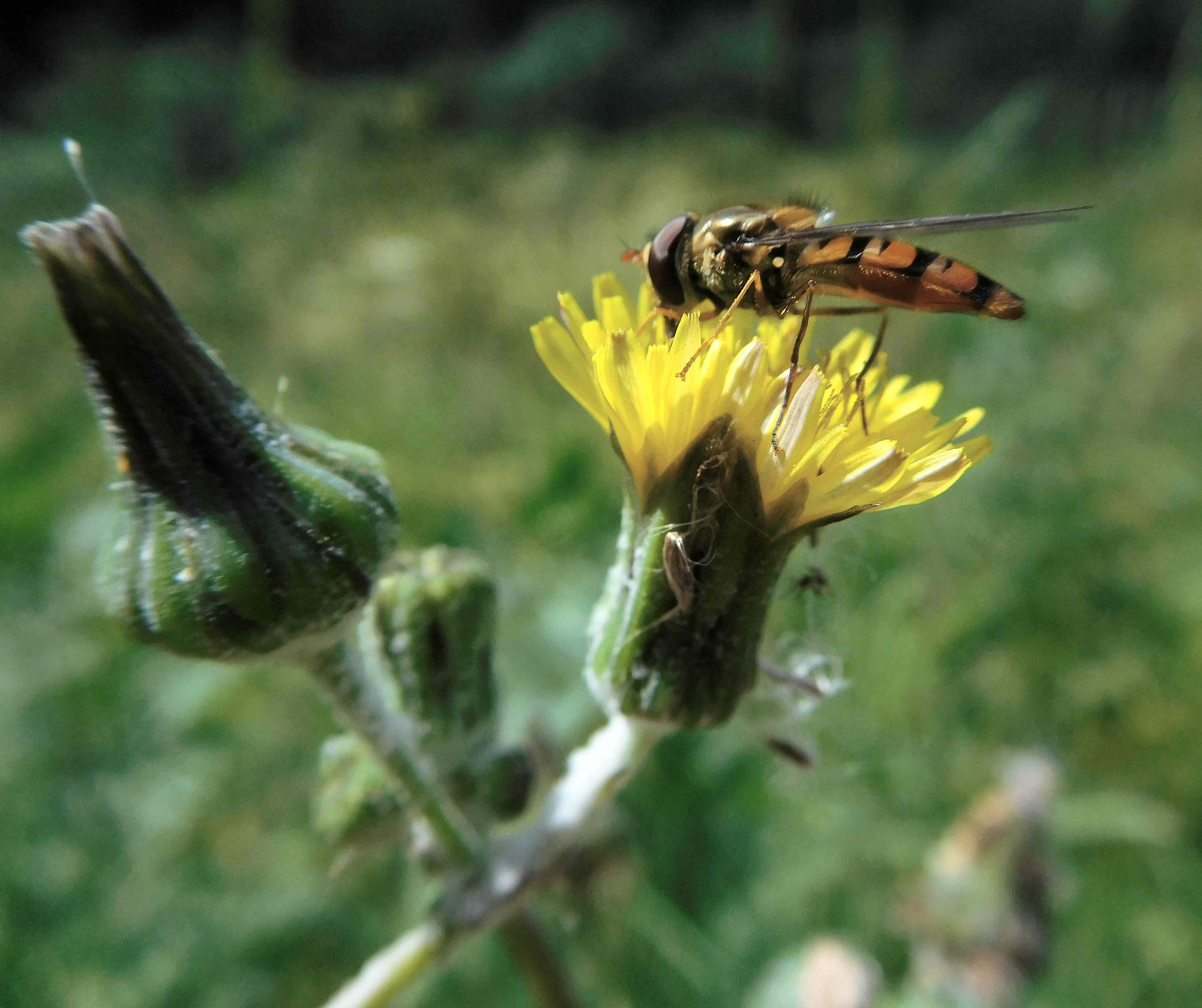
Hoverfly on catsear

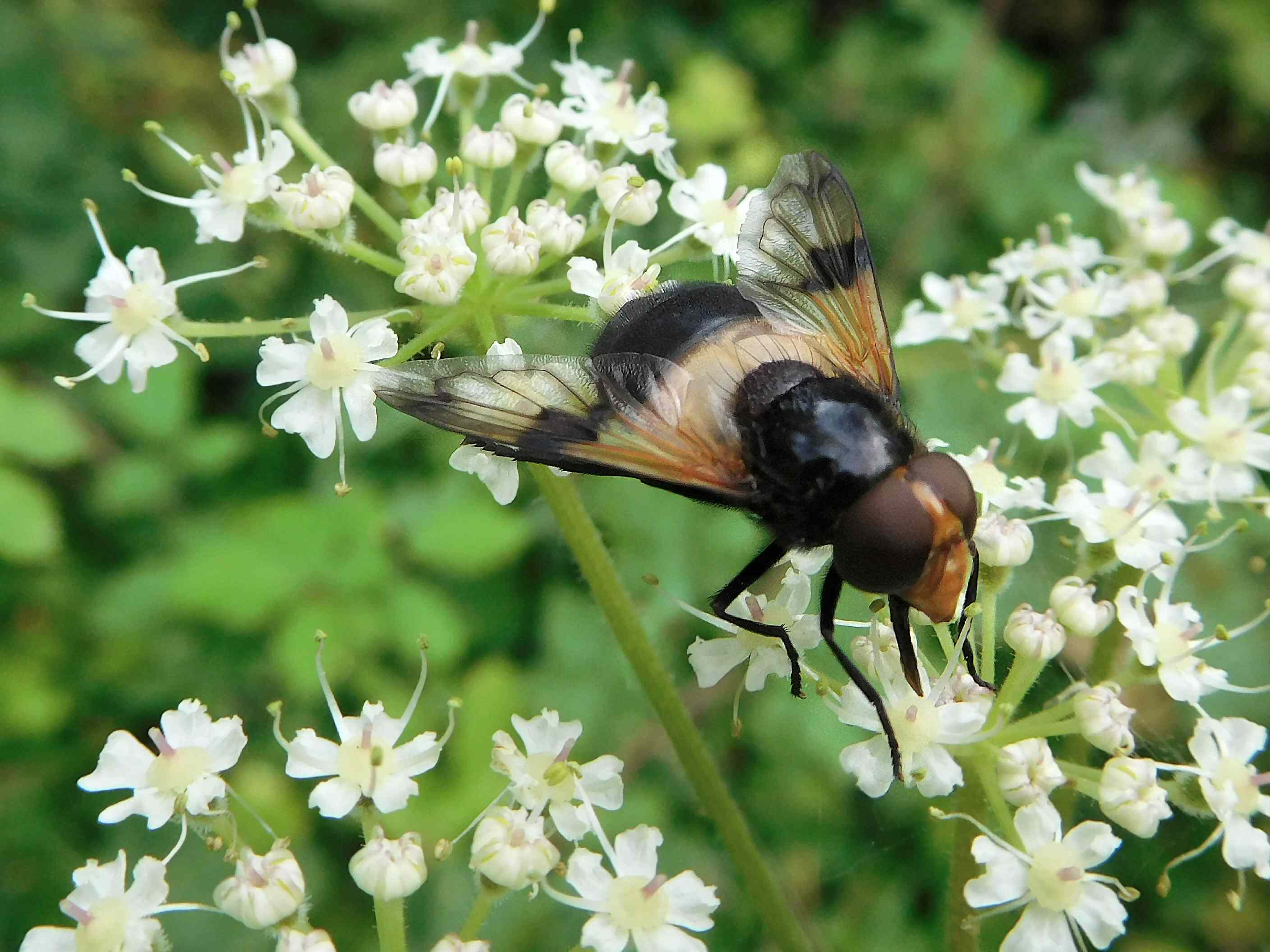
Hoverfly Leucozona lucorum

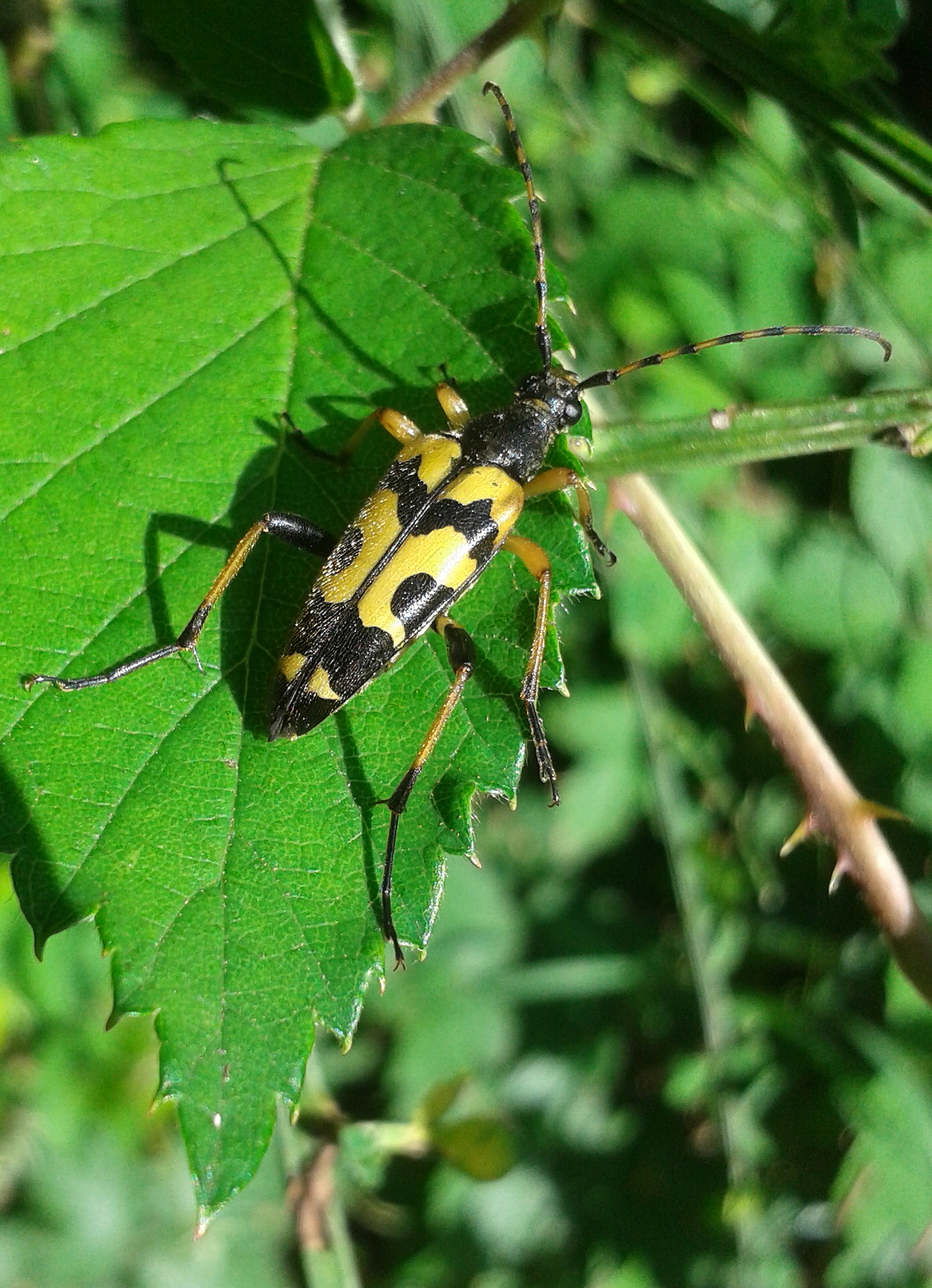
Rutpela (Strangalia) maculata, a longhorn beetle and a wasp mimic

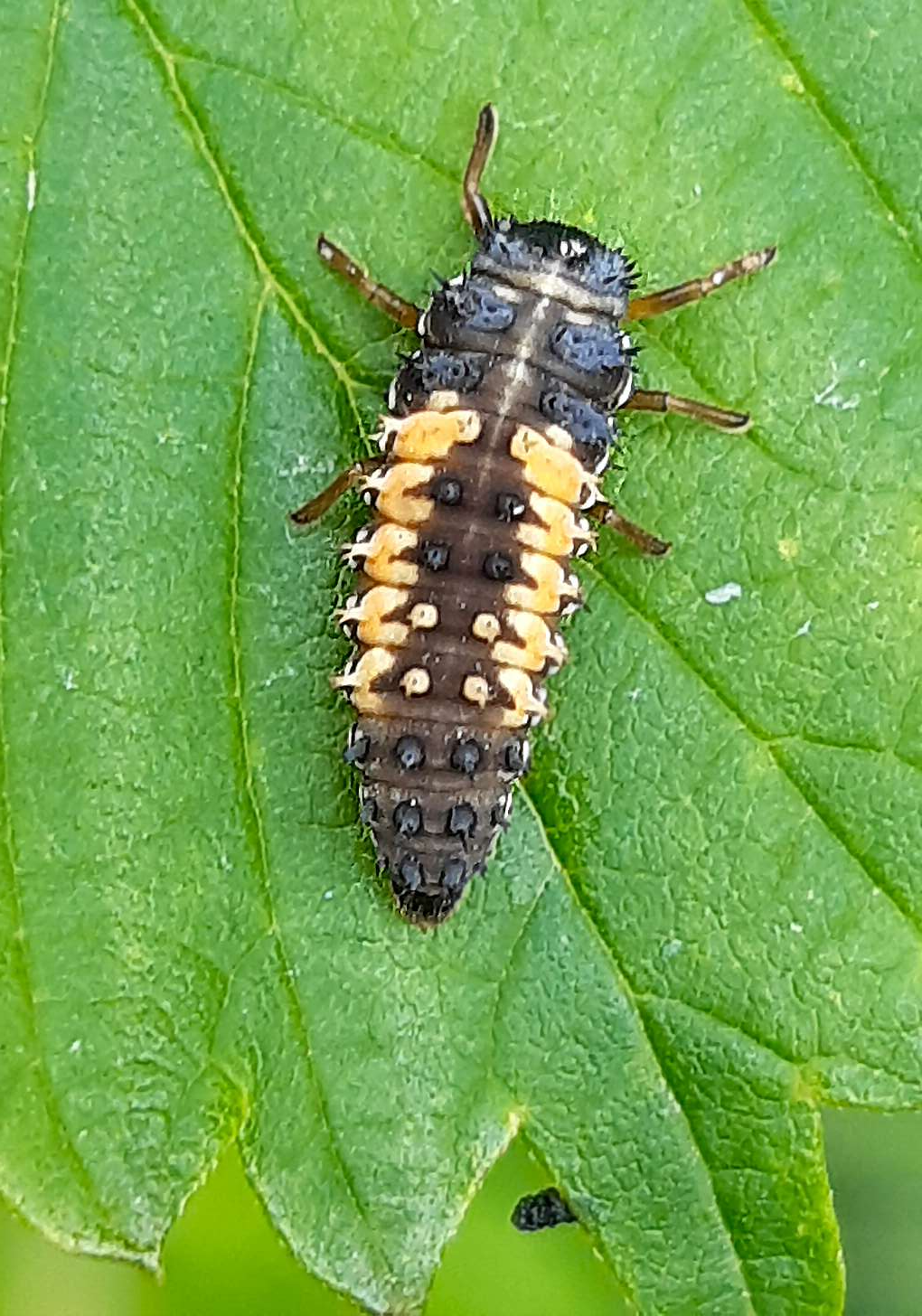
Harlequin ladybird nymph, Harmonia axyridis

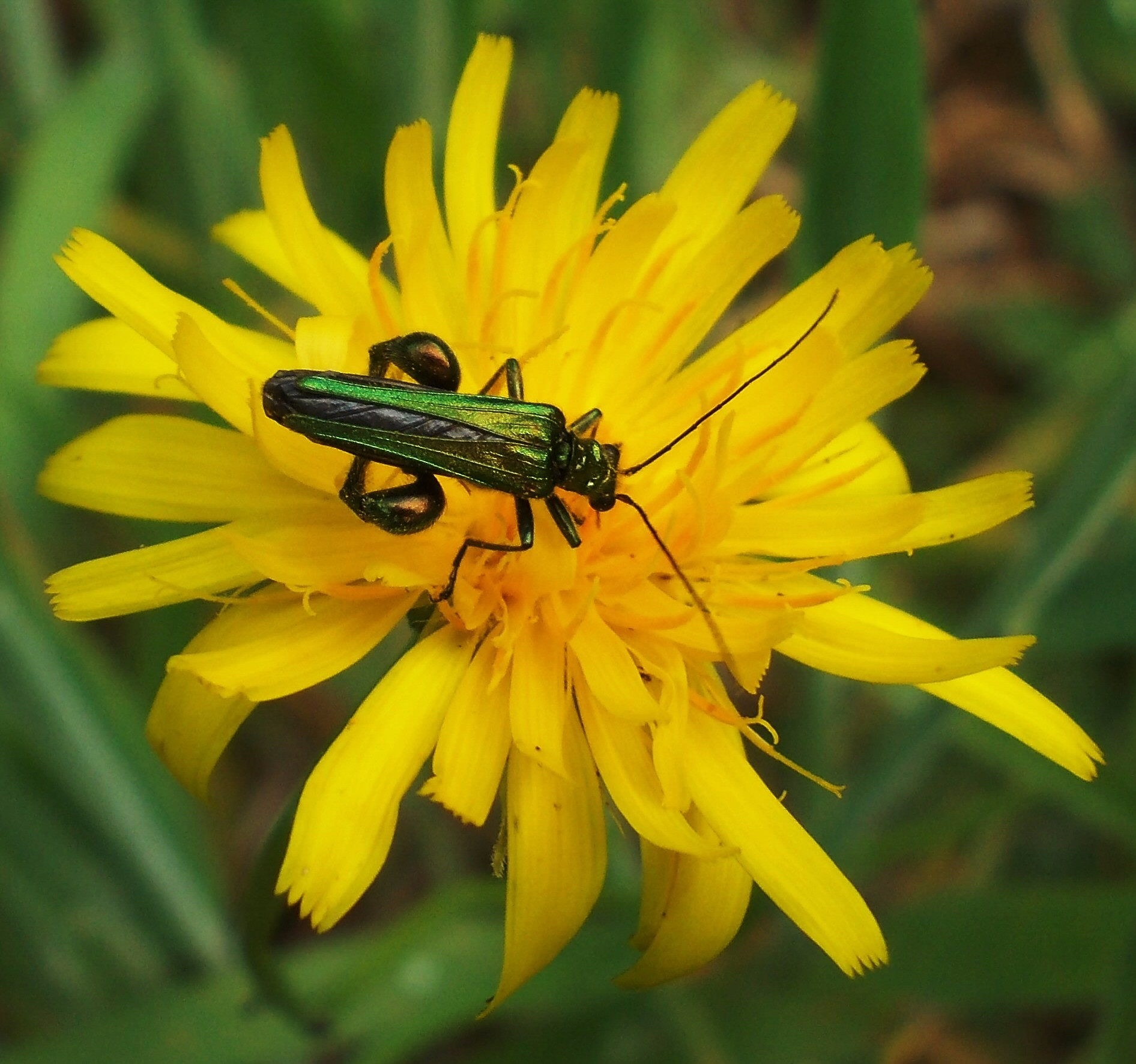
Male thick-kneed flower beetle, Oedemera nobilis, on catsear,

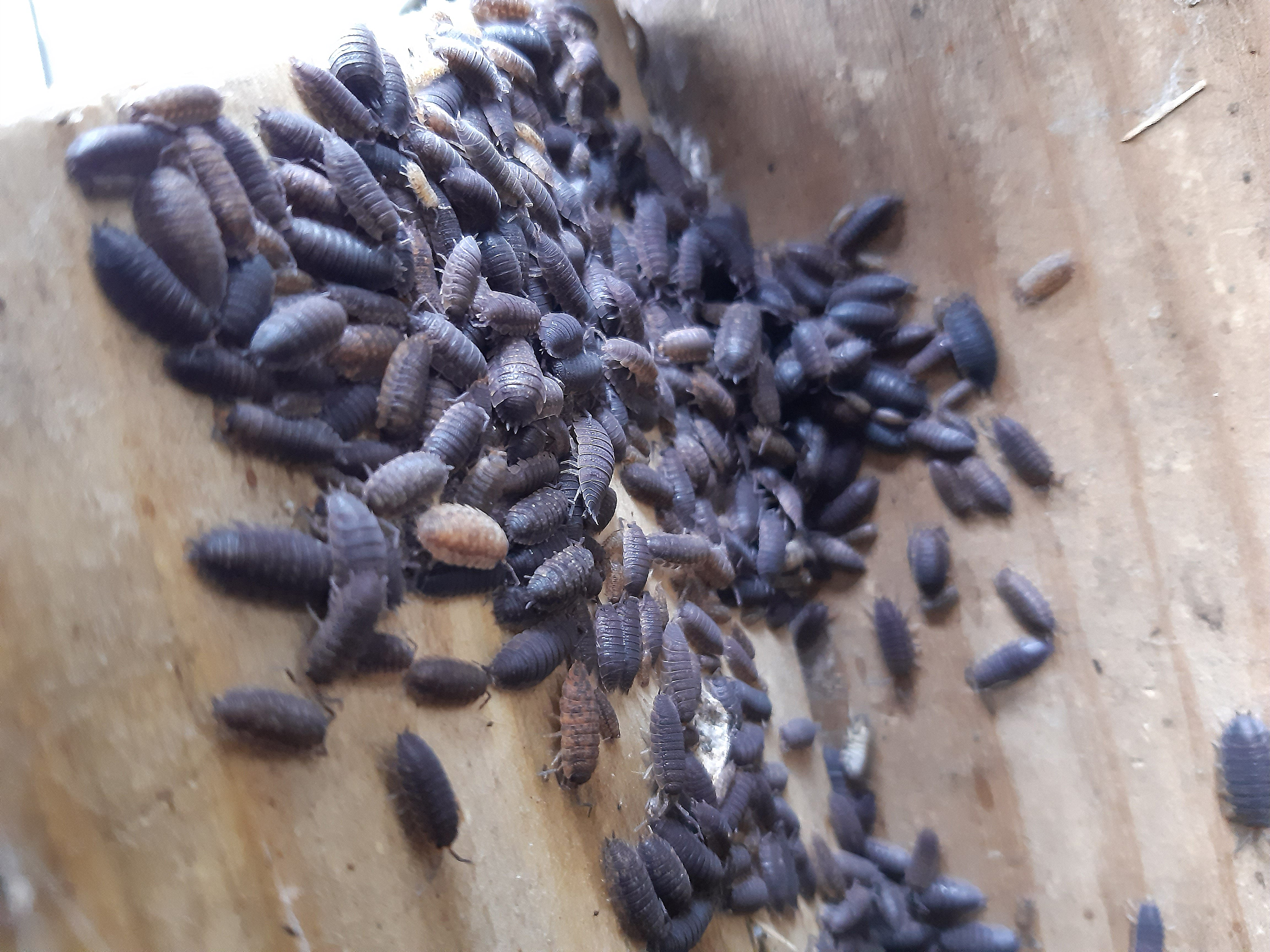
Woodlice sheltering in a nestbox
Spiders

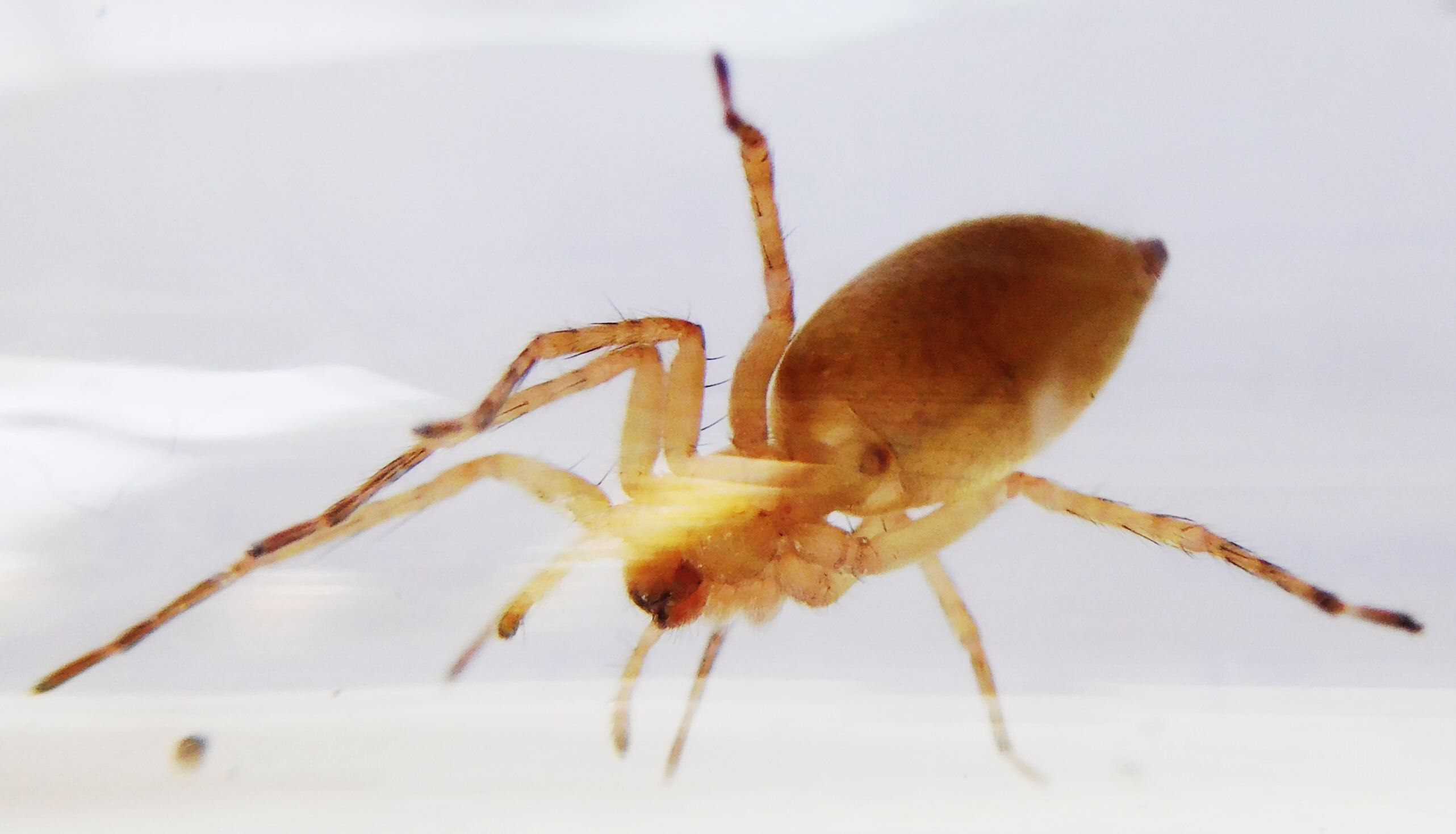
Anyphaena numida, a North African spider, only the second UK record for the species

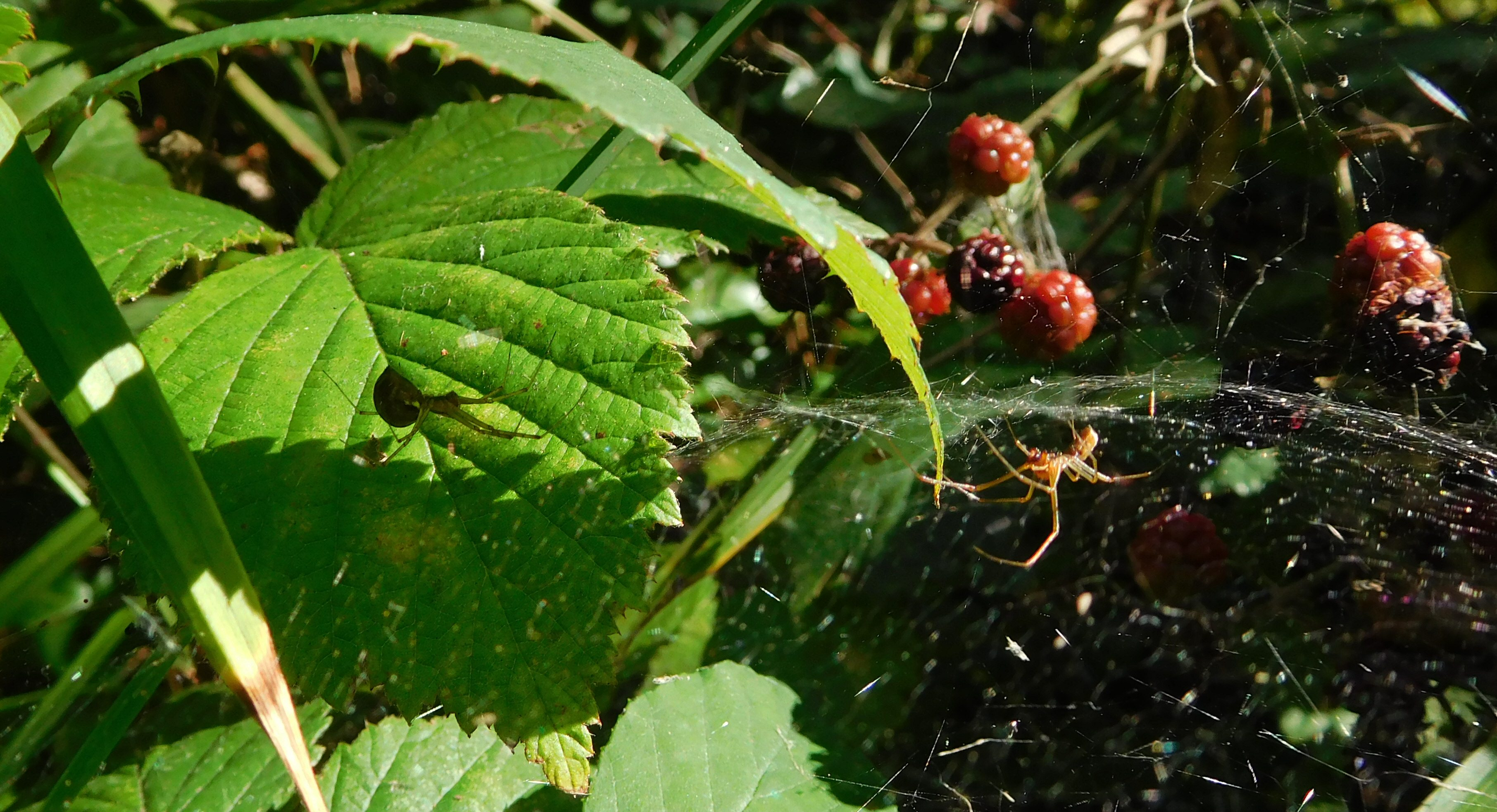
Linyphia triangularis sheetweb spider female and male

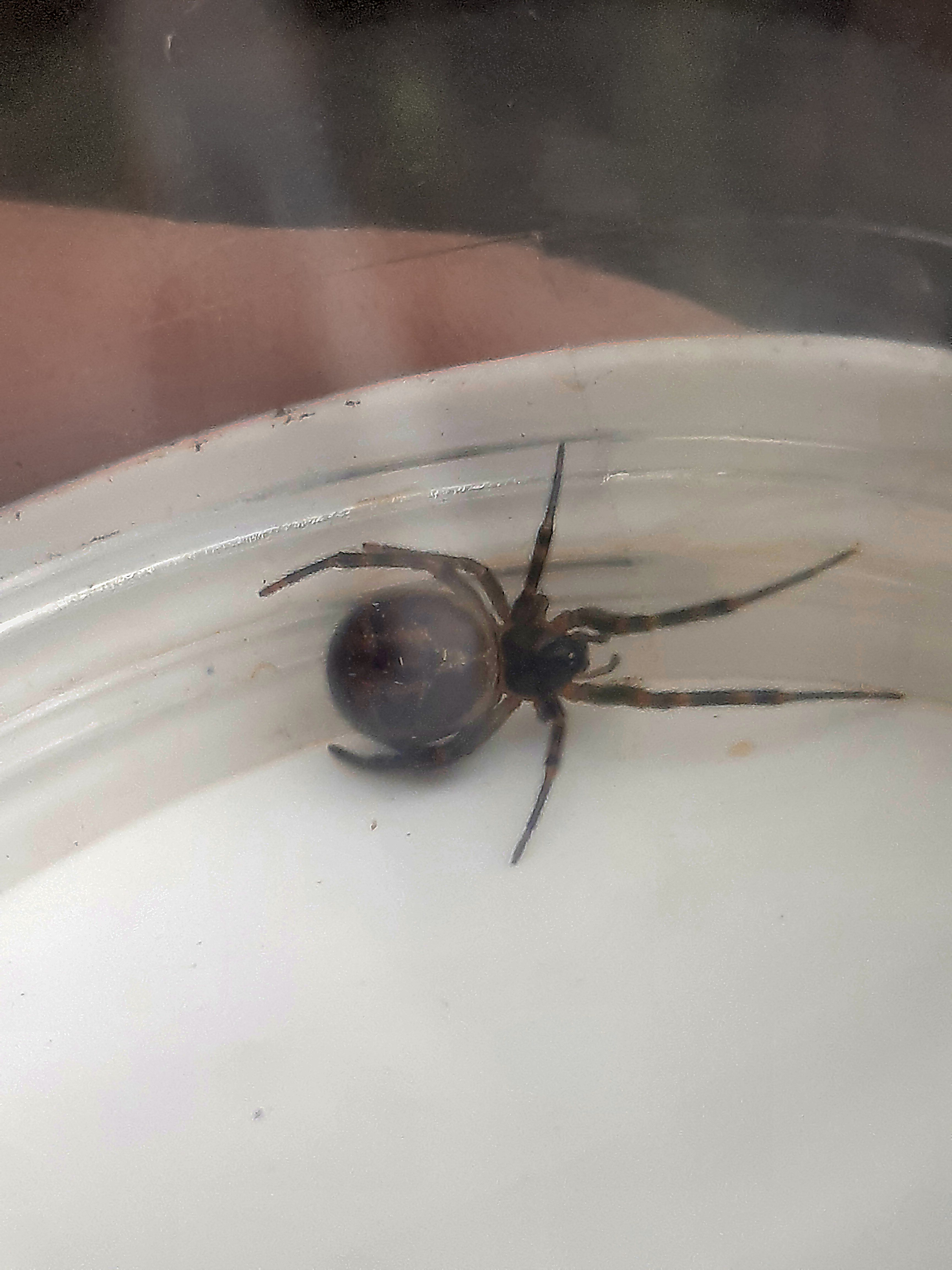
False widow spider, Steatoda sp., from a nestbox

==== Fungi ====
Basidiomycetes
Gill mushrooms

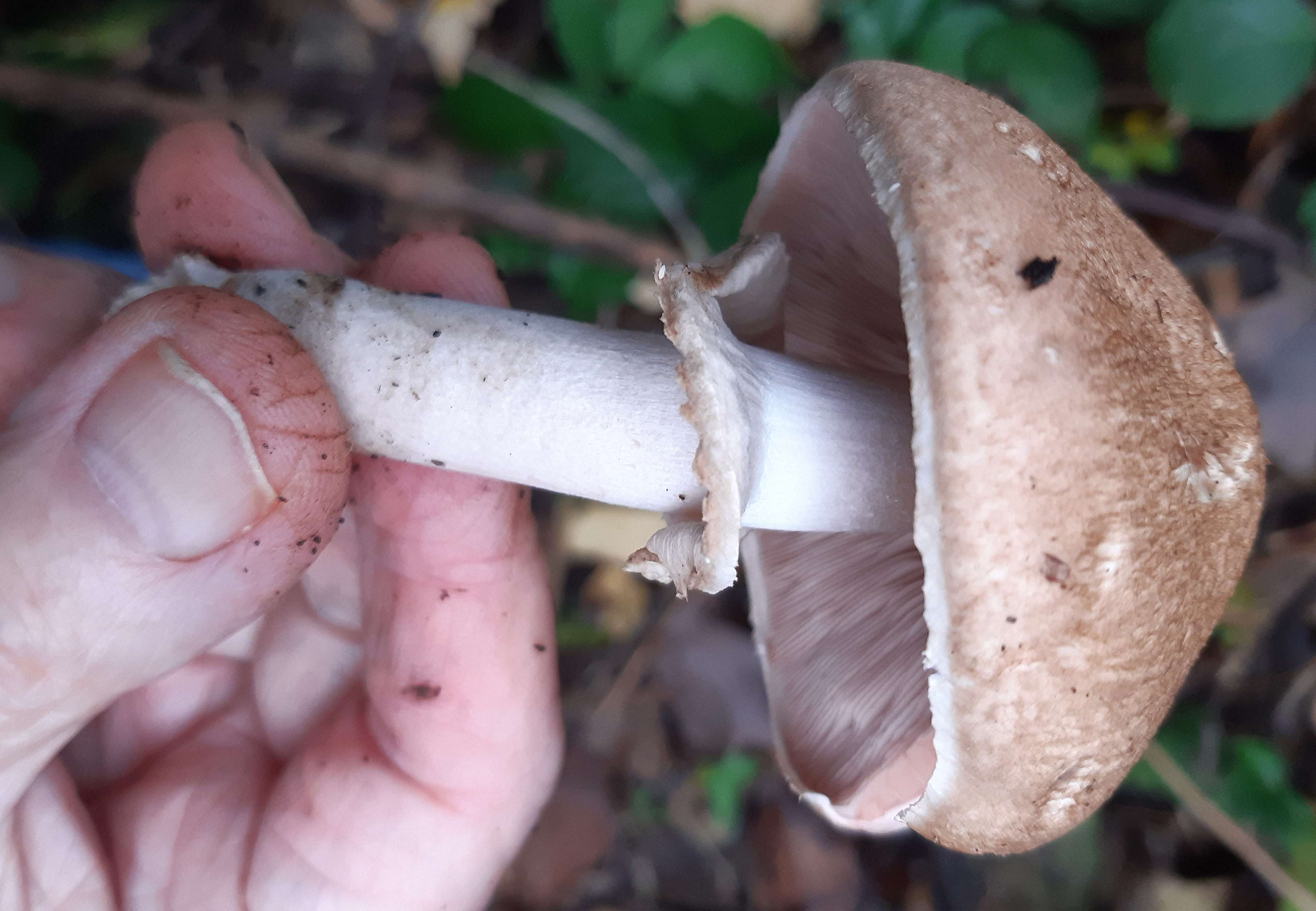
Agaricus sp. in deadhedge by main pond

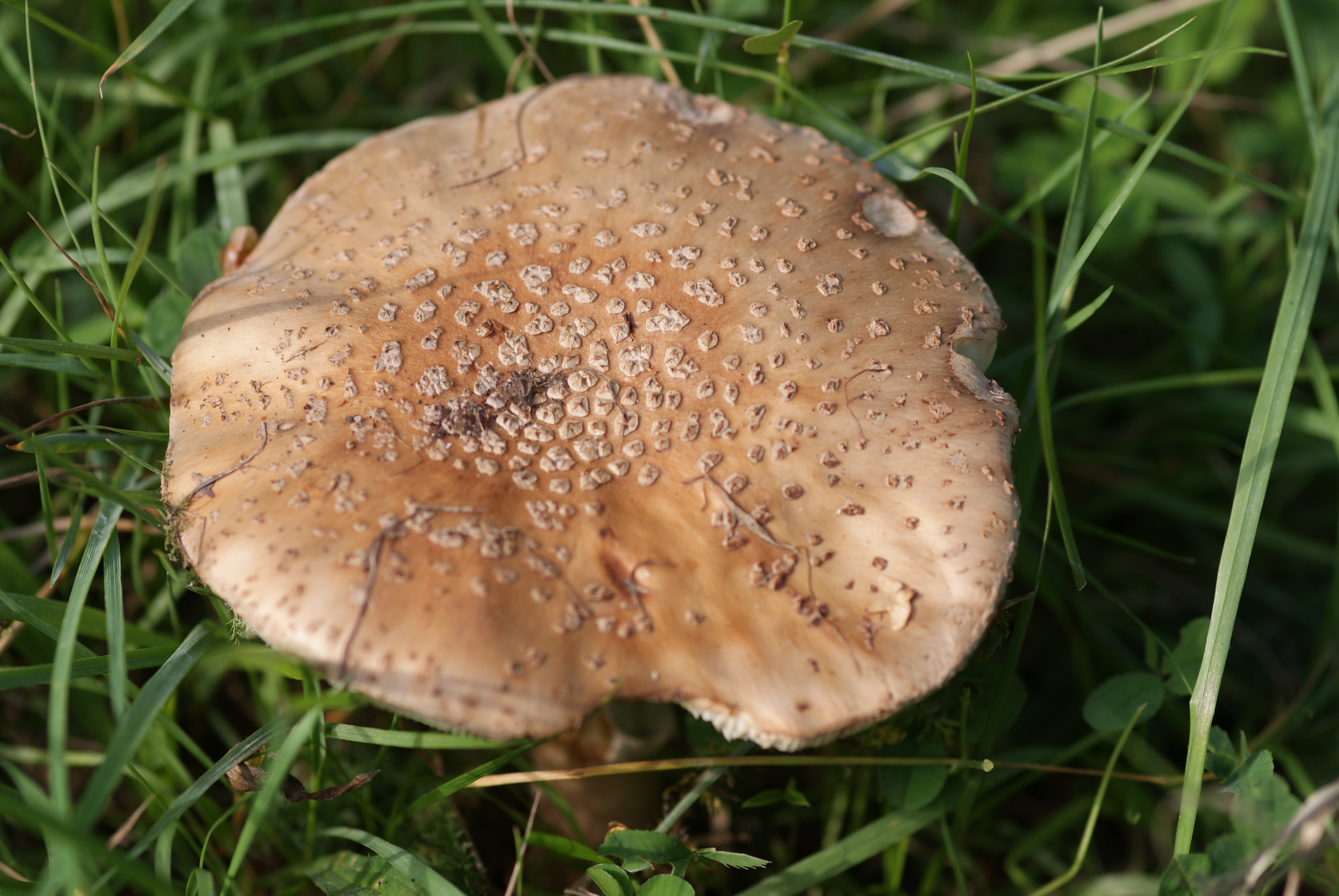
Blusher mushroom, Amanita rubescens

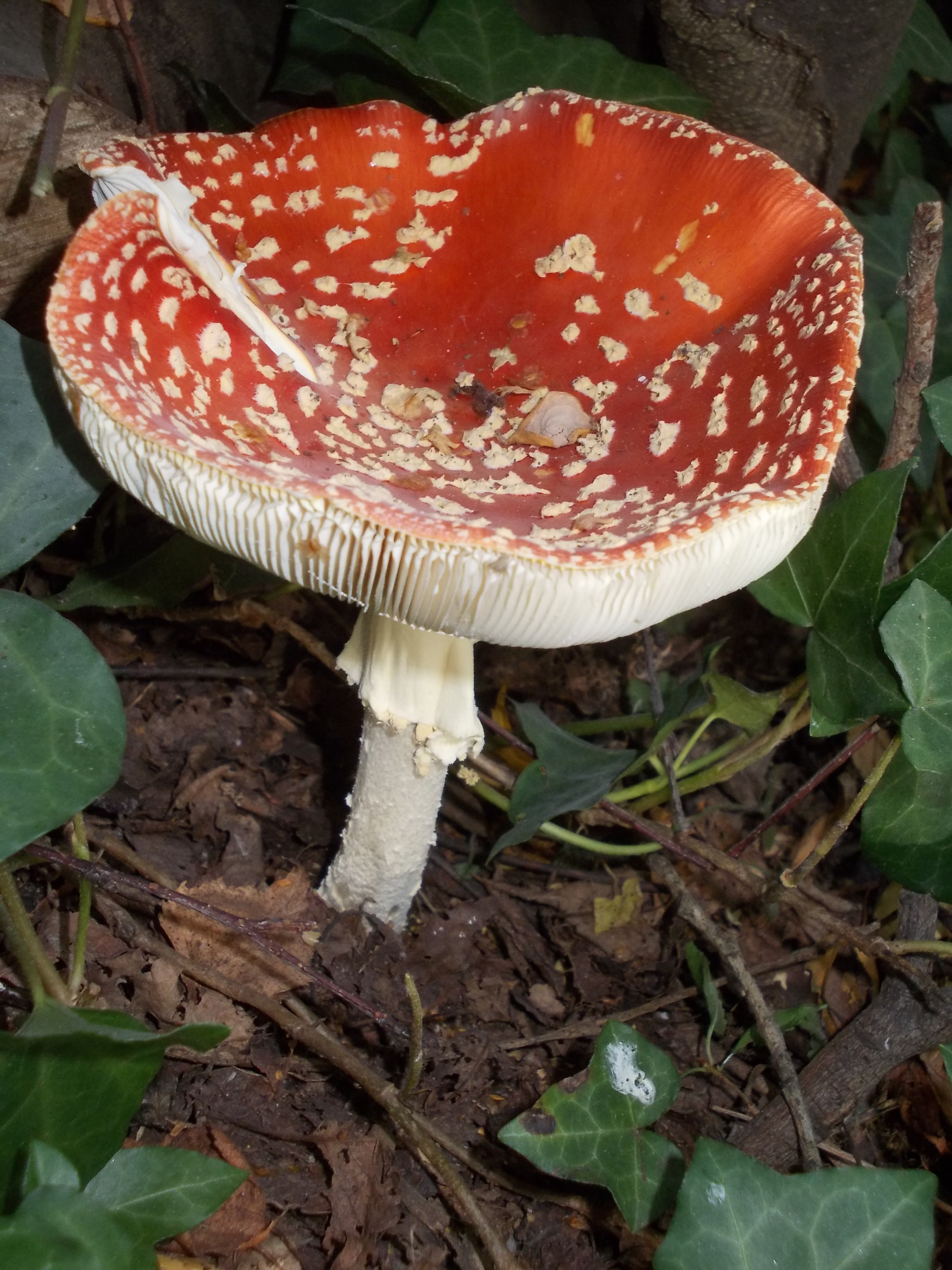
Fly agaric, Amanita muscaria

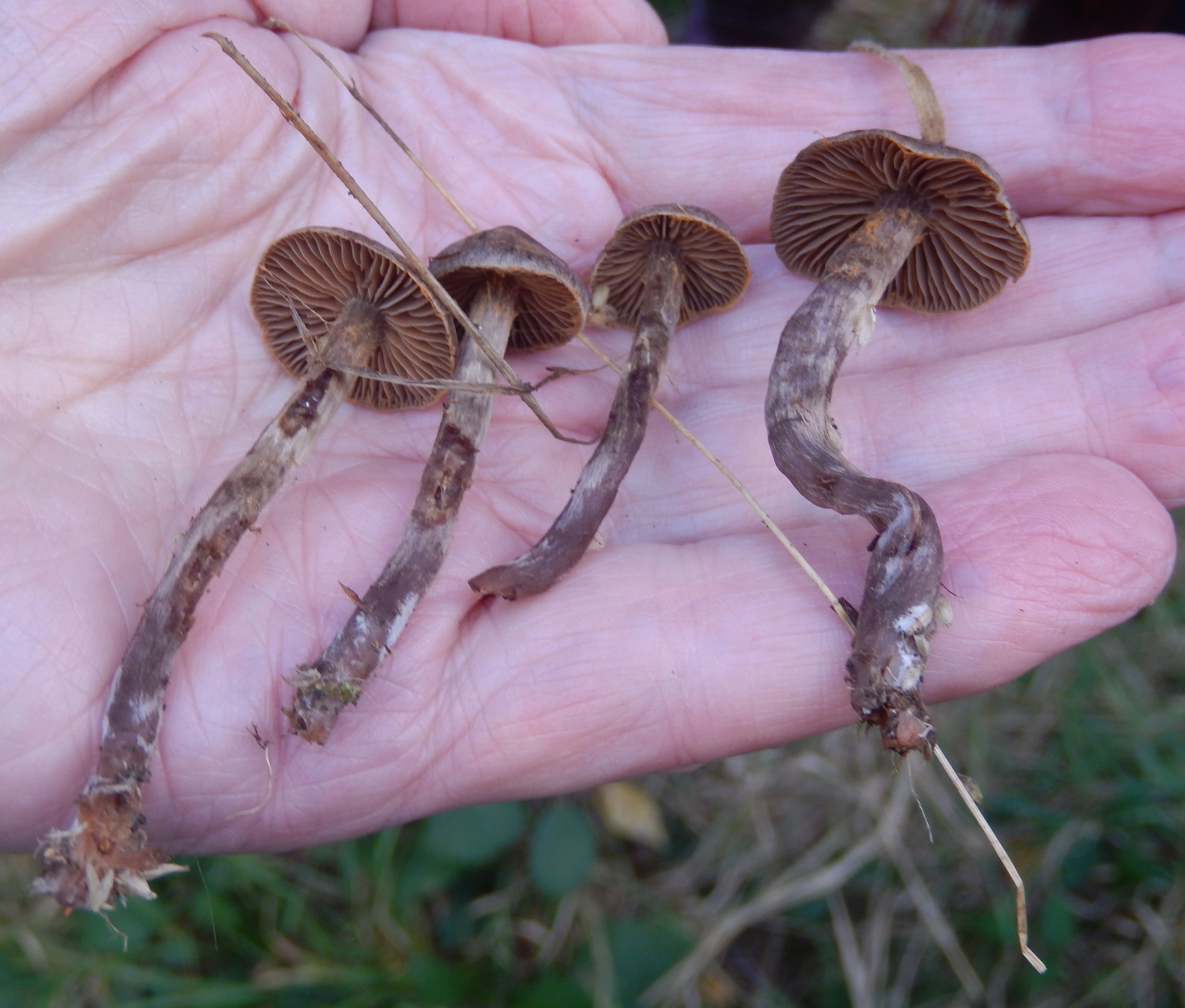
Webcaps, Cortinarius

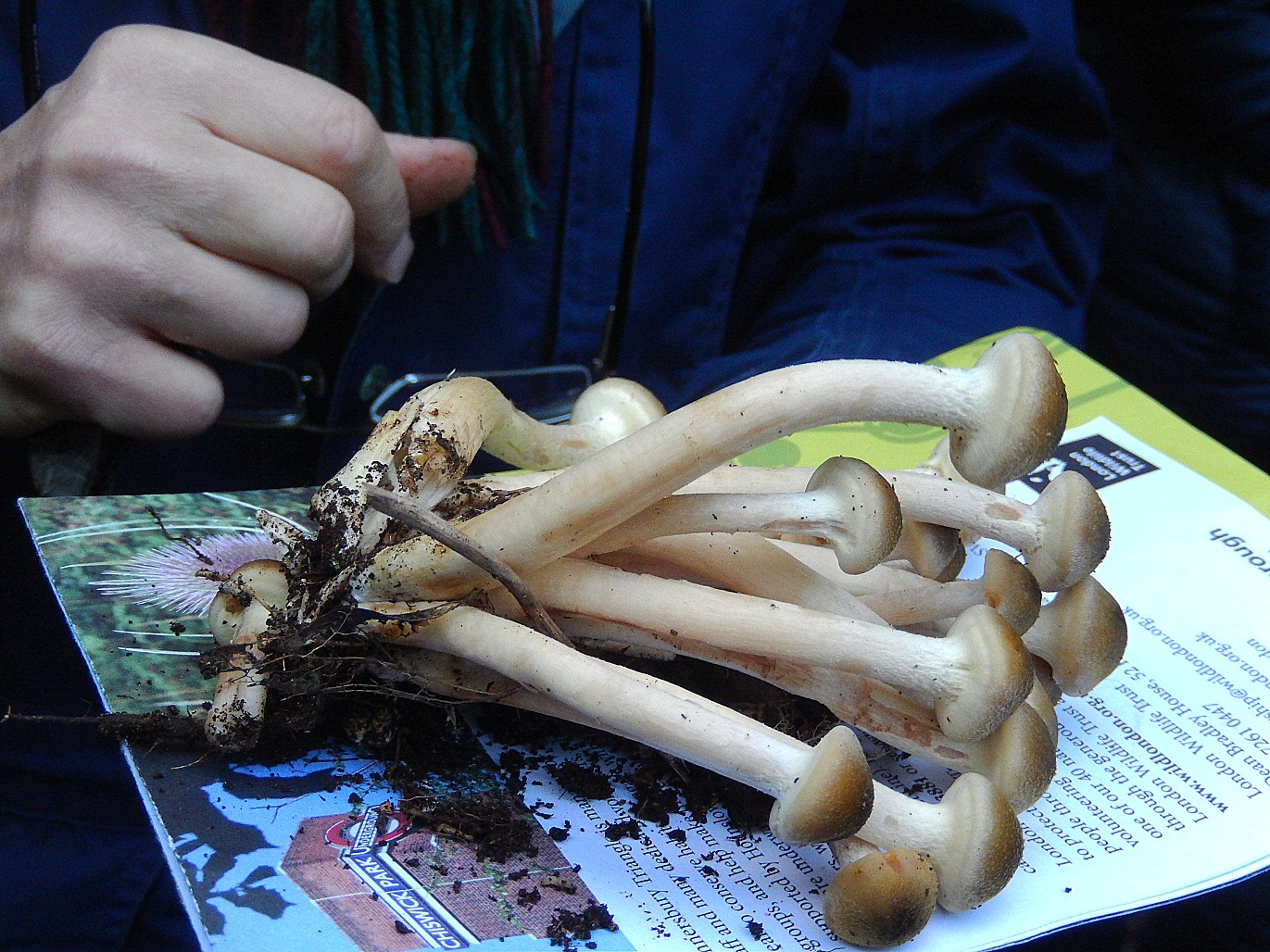
Honey fungus, Armillaria mellea

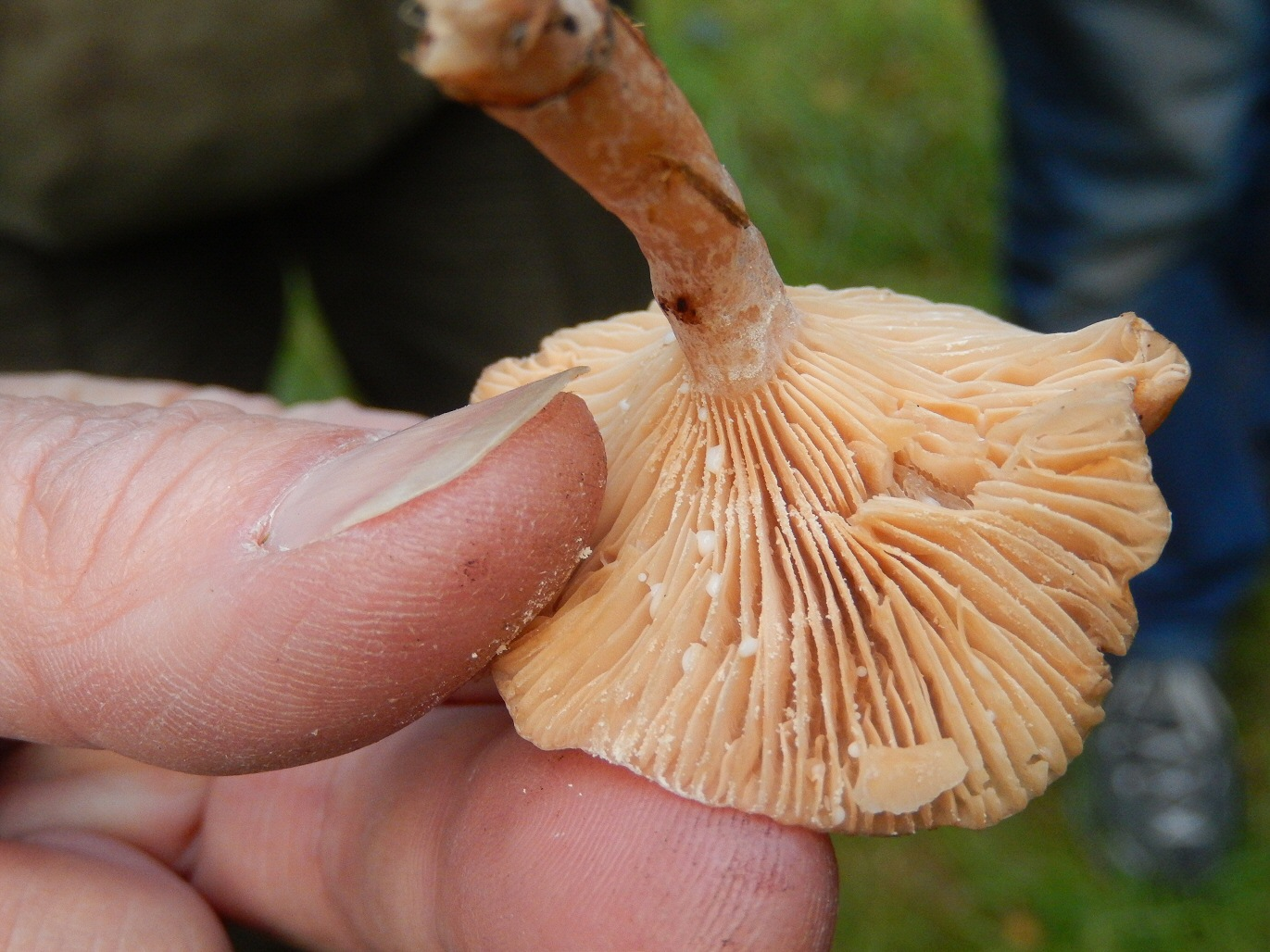
Mild milkcap, Lactarius subdulcis

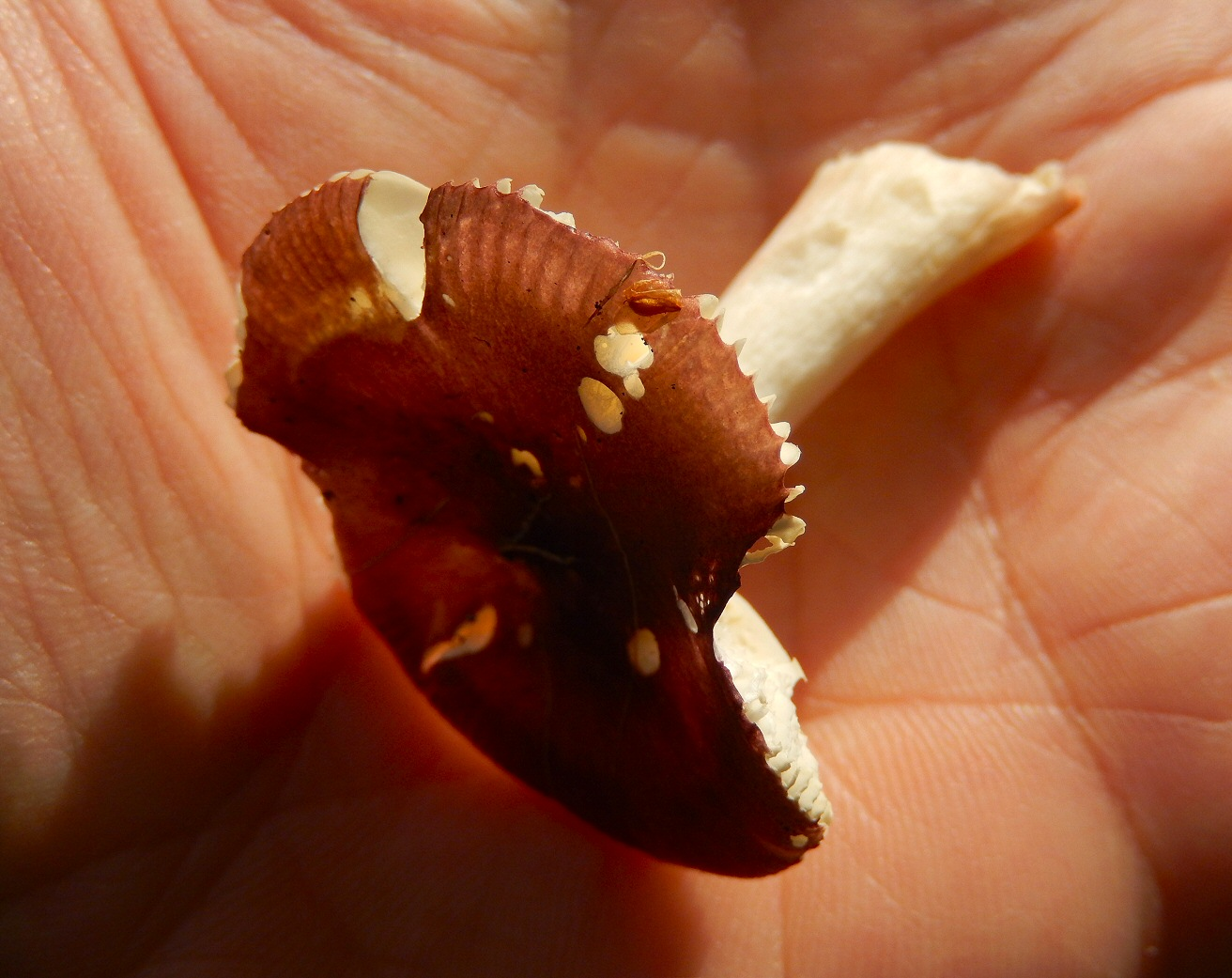
Purple swamp brittlegill, Russula nitida

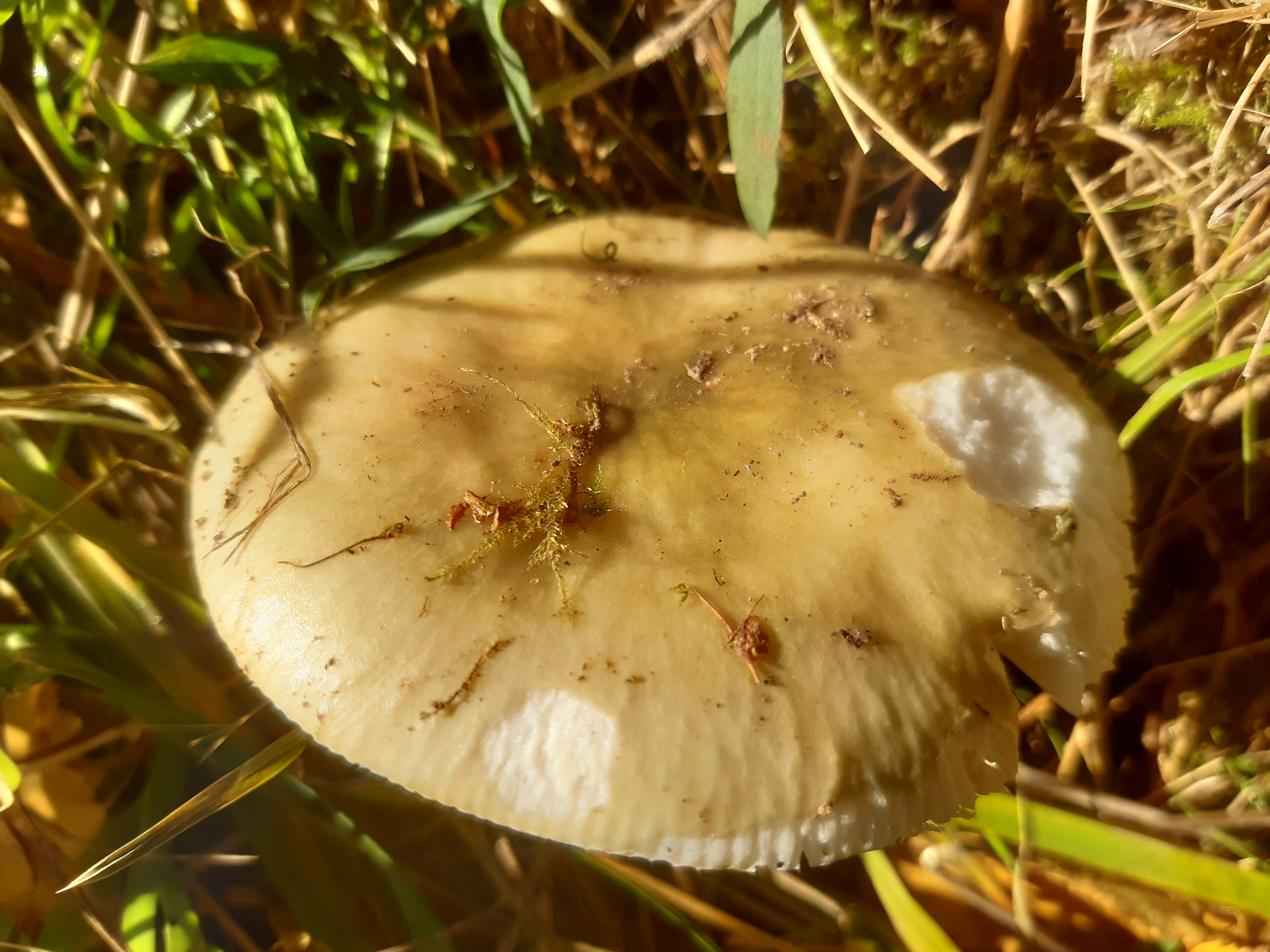
Birch Brittlegill, Russula betularum (yellow form)

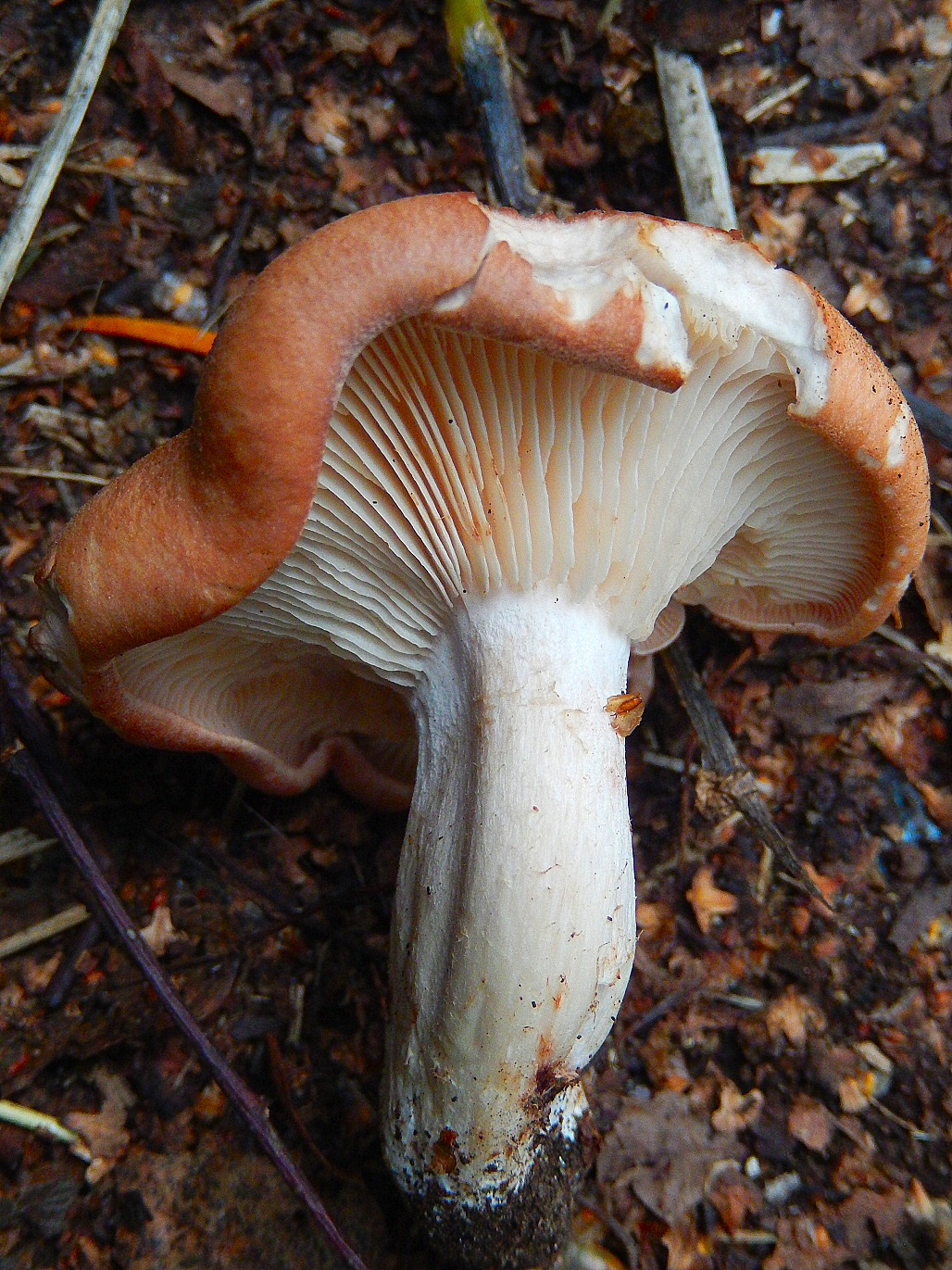
Rhodocybe gemina, a new species for the reserve

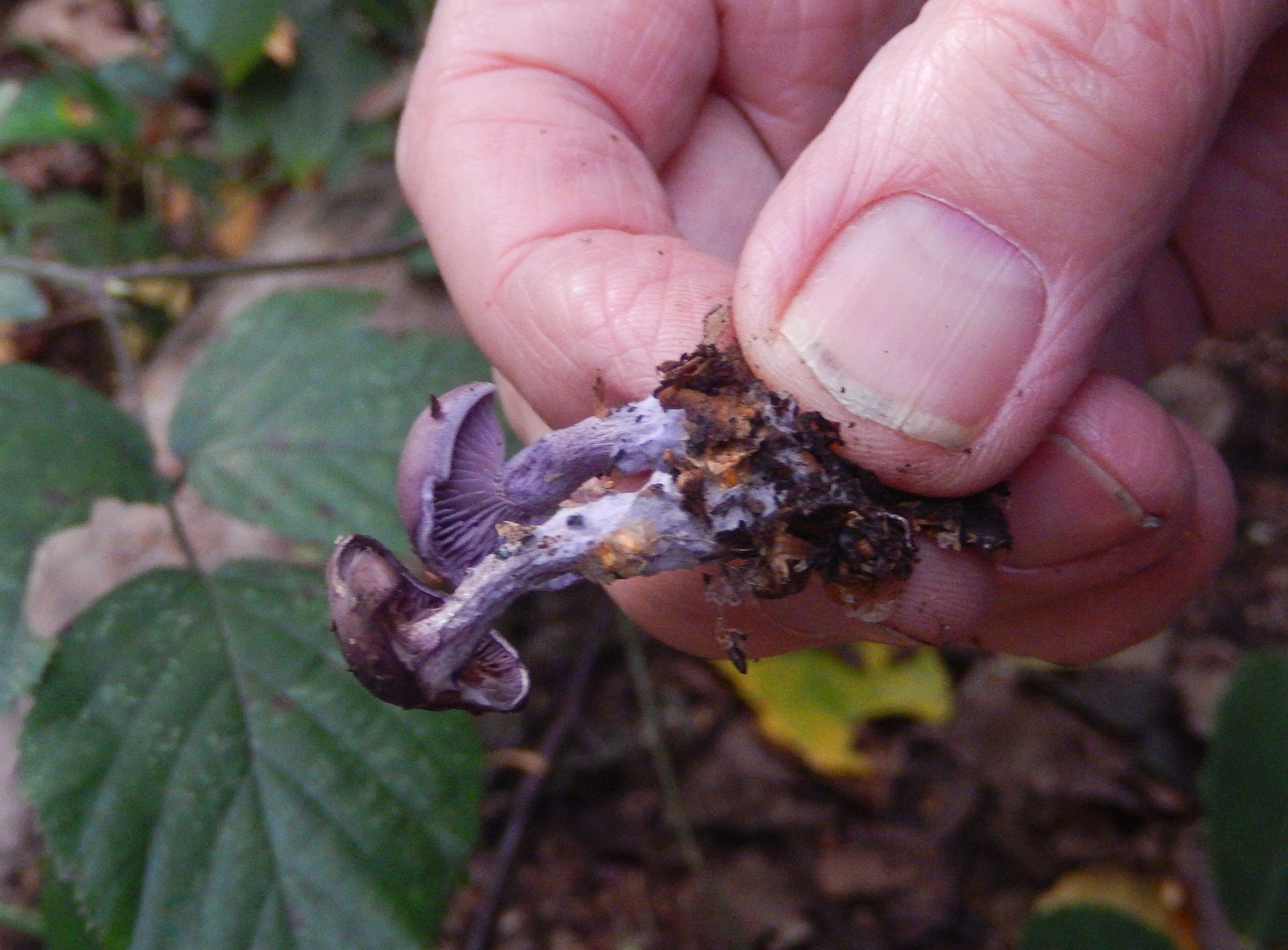
Lilac fibrecap, Inocybe geophylla var. lilacina

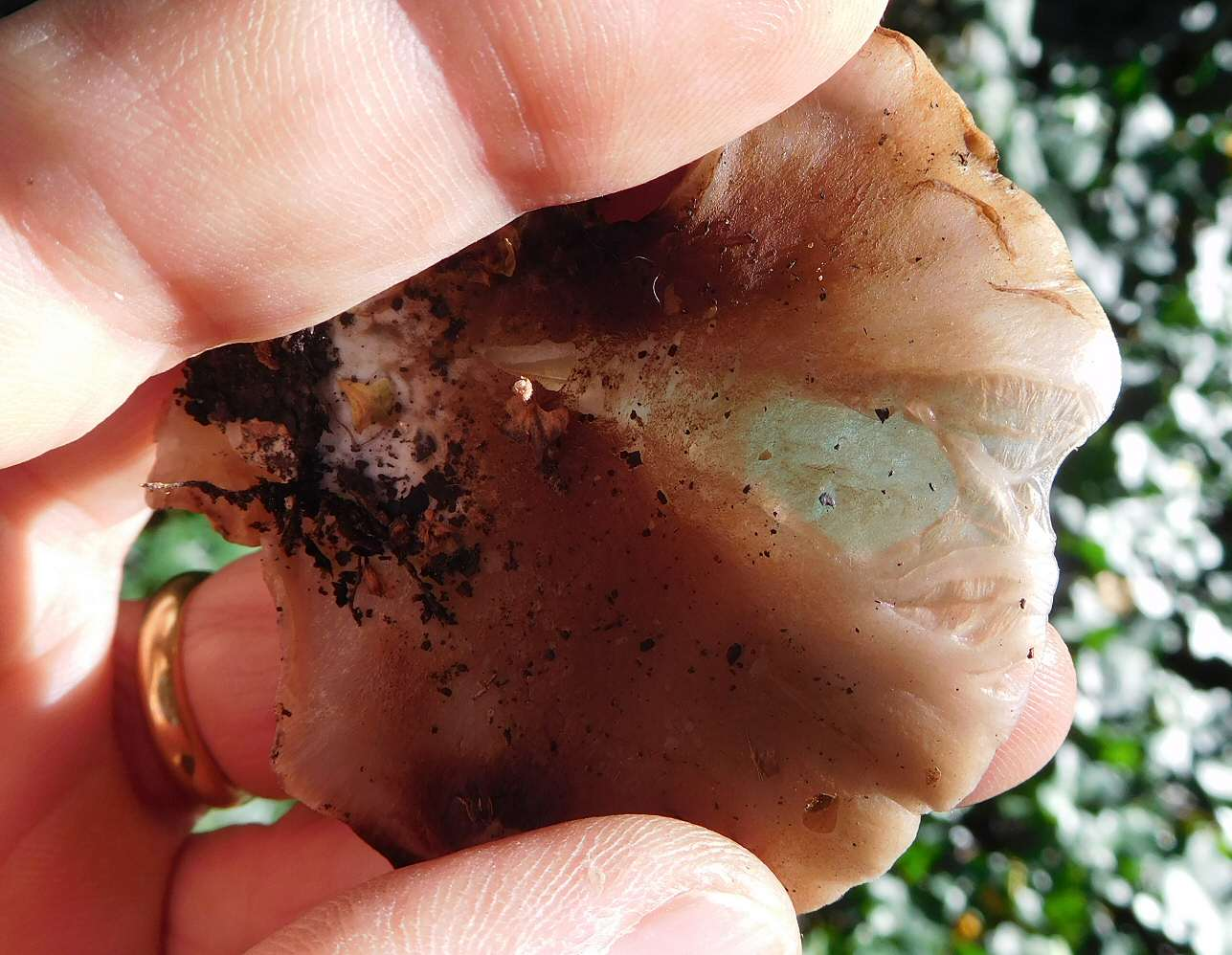
Peeling oysterling or soft slipper, Crepidotus mollis, showing internal gelatinous layer when stretched

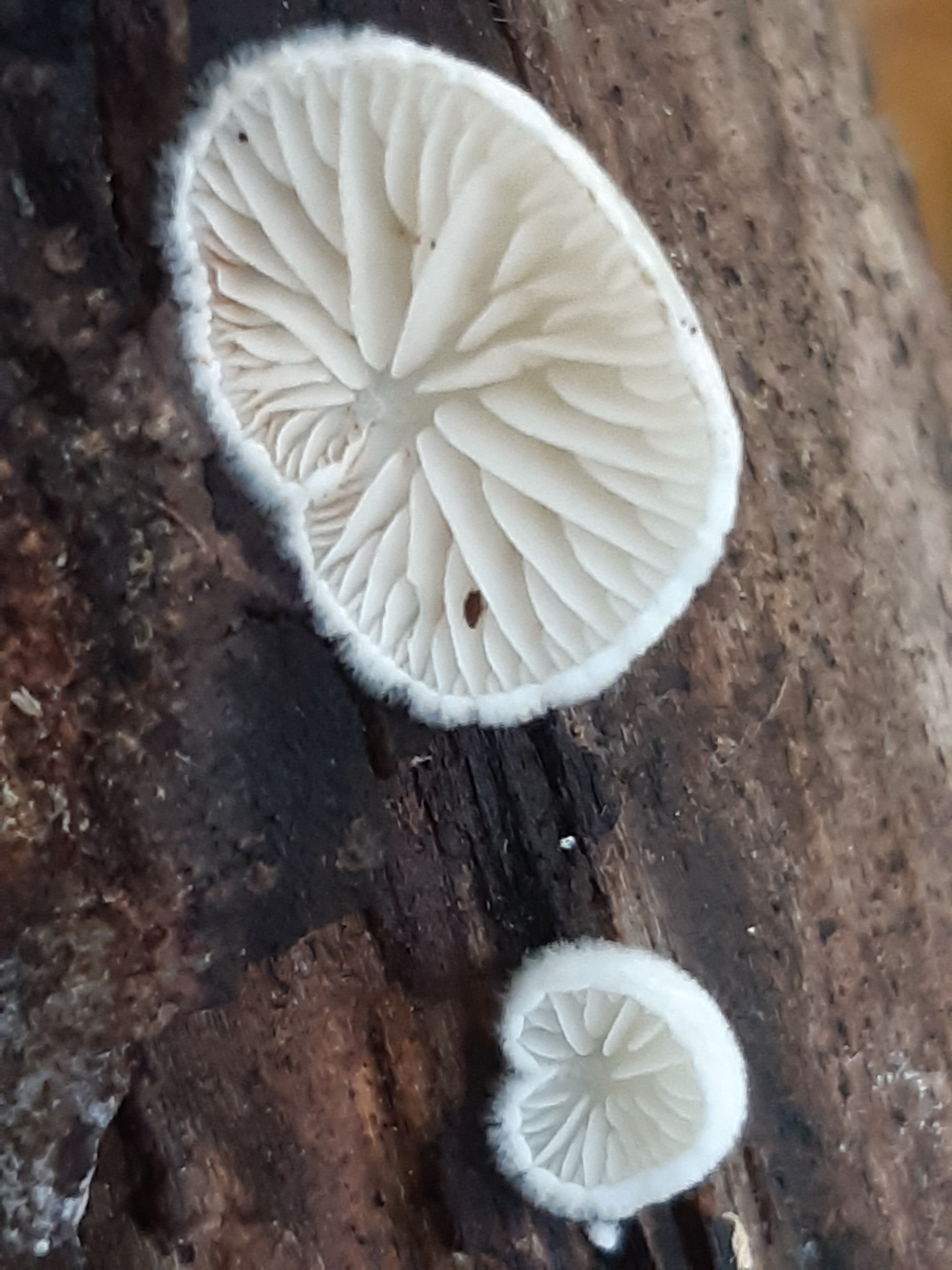
Flat oysterling, Crepidotus cf applanatus

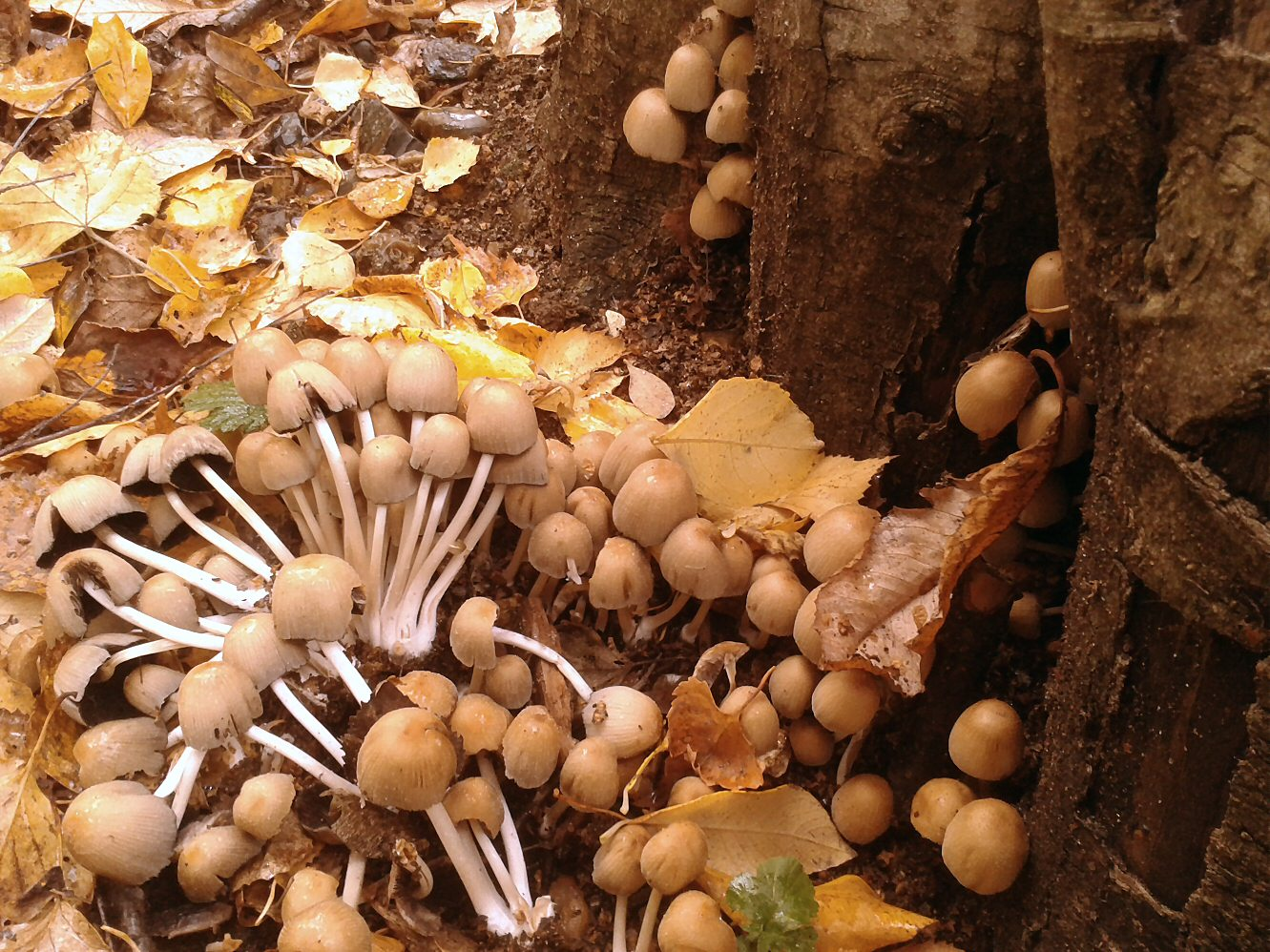
Brittlestem, Psathyrella multipedata, on willow loggery

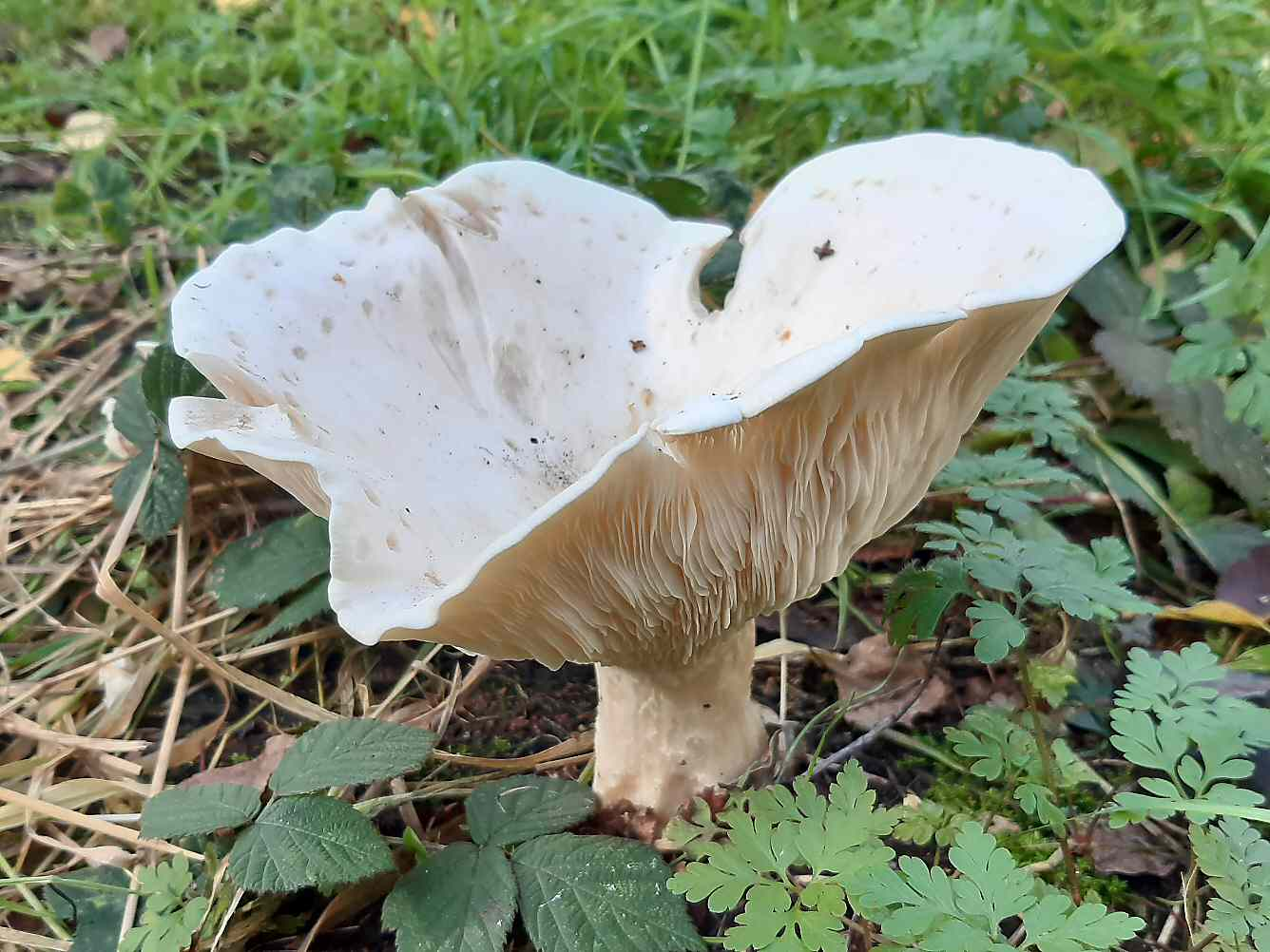
Giant funnel, Leucopaxillus giganteus

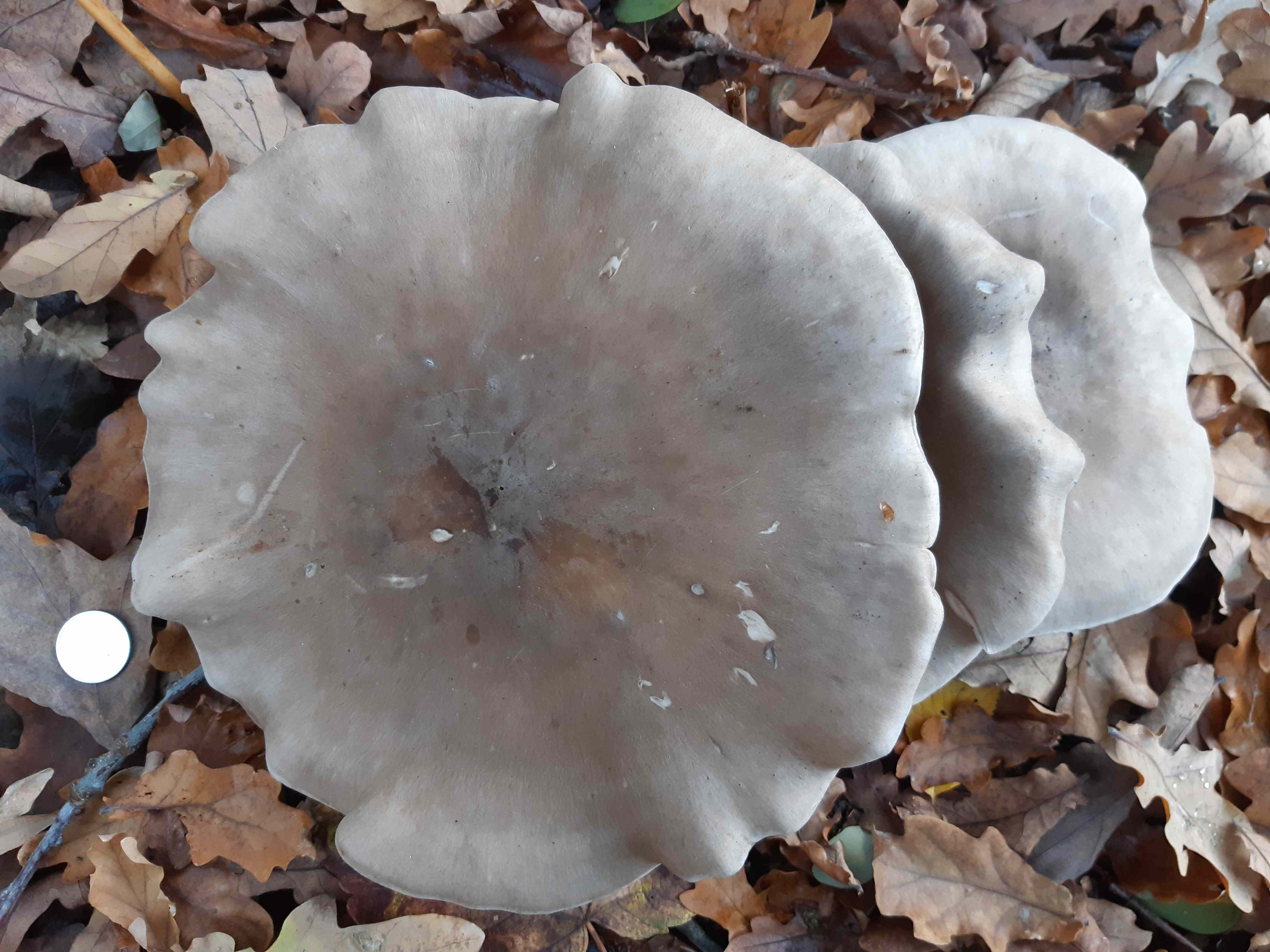
Clouded funnel, Clitocybe nebularis, large specimen

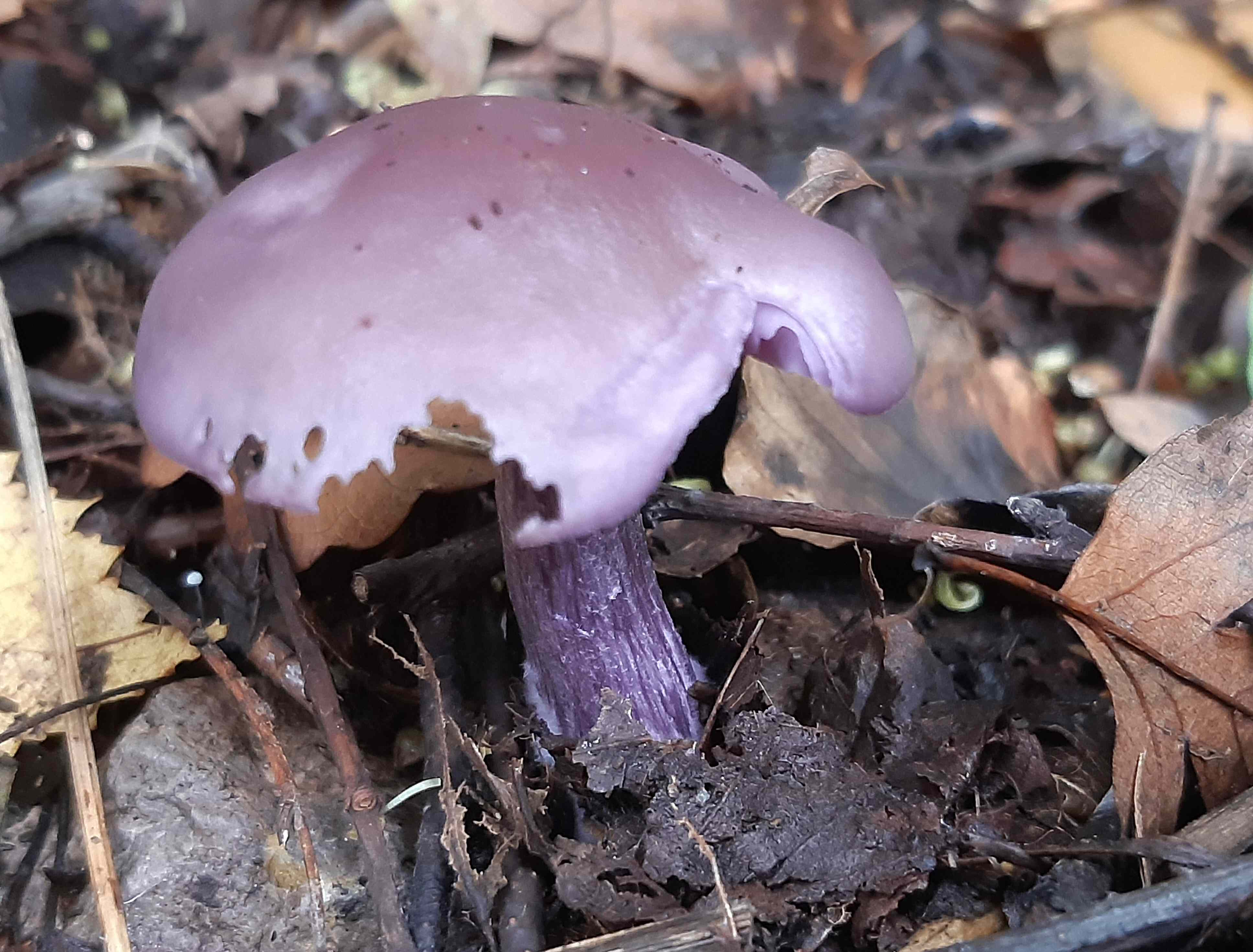
Wood blewit, Lepista nuda

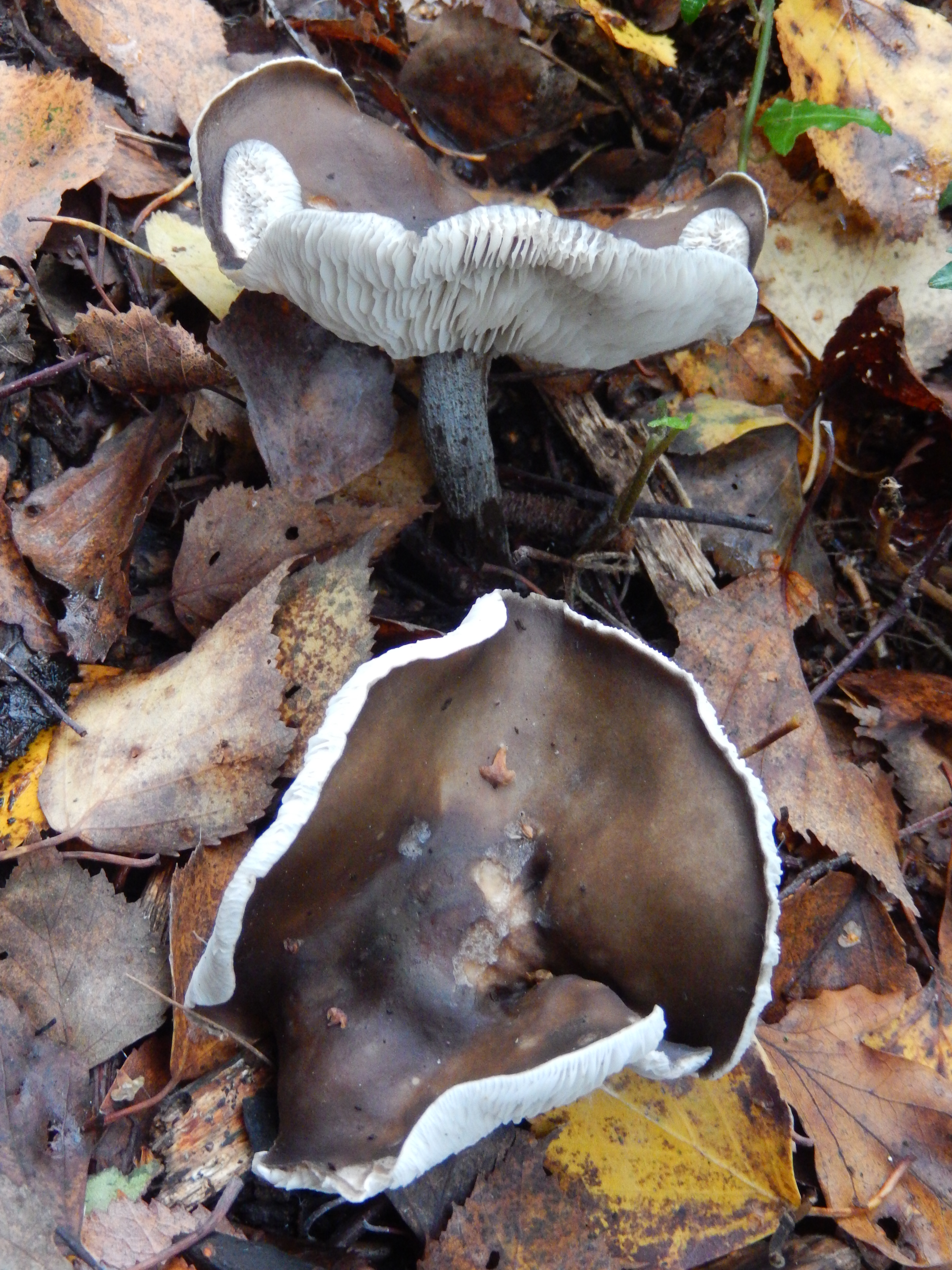
Common cavalier, Melanoleuca polioleuca

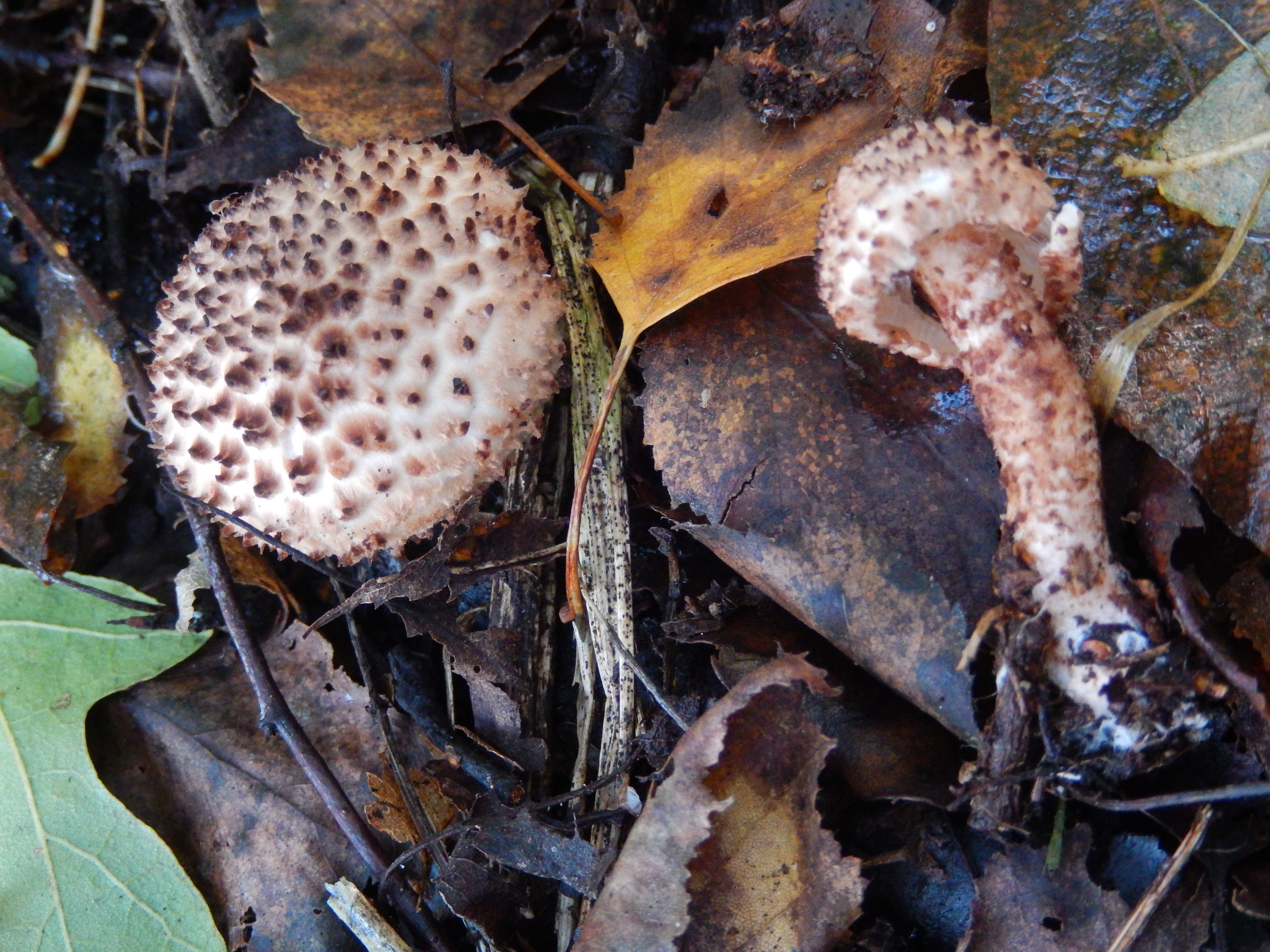
A dapperling, Lepiota cf. hystrix

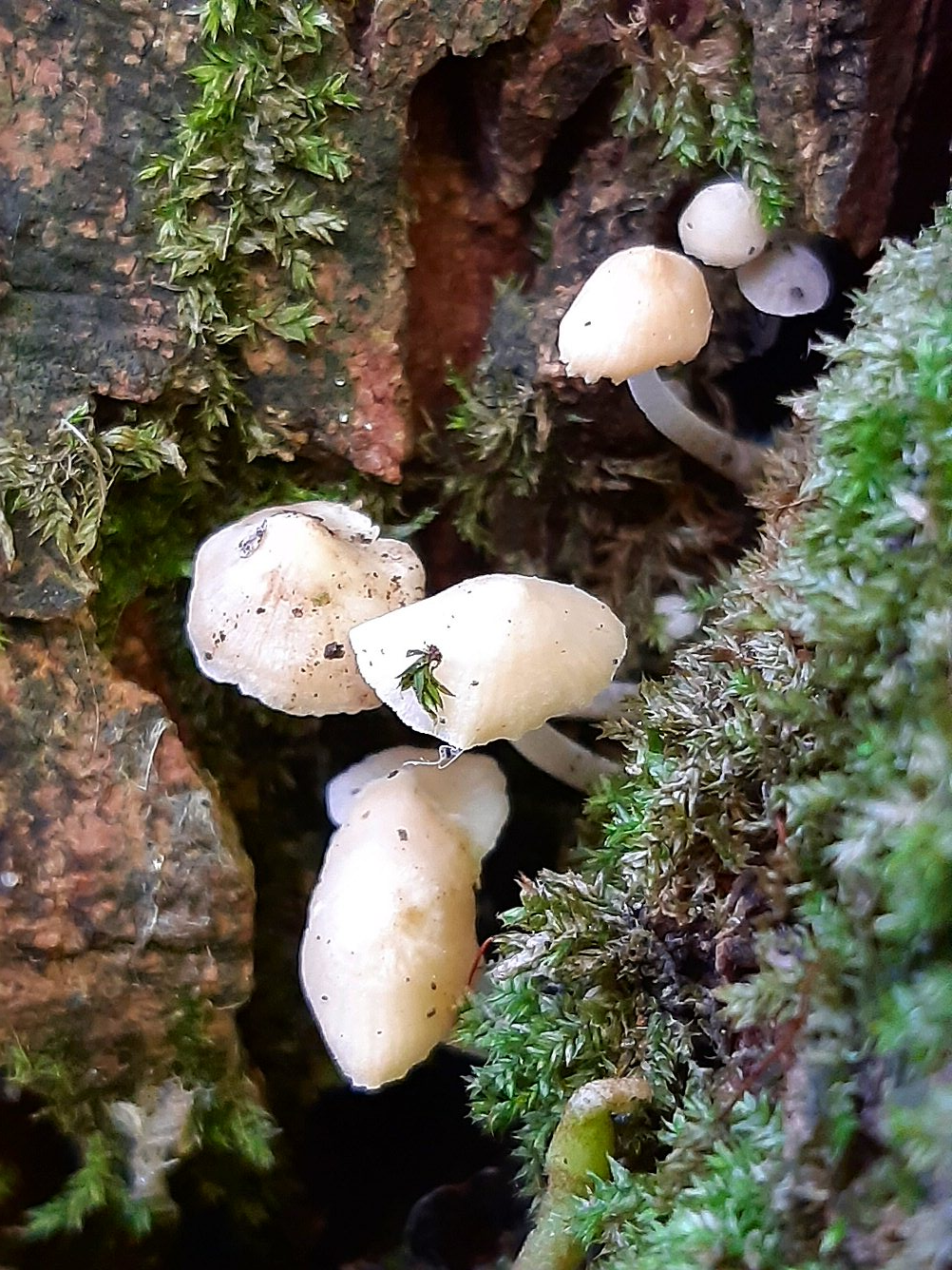
Moss bonnet, Mycena olida

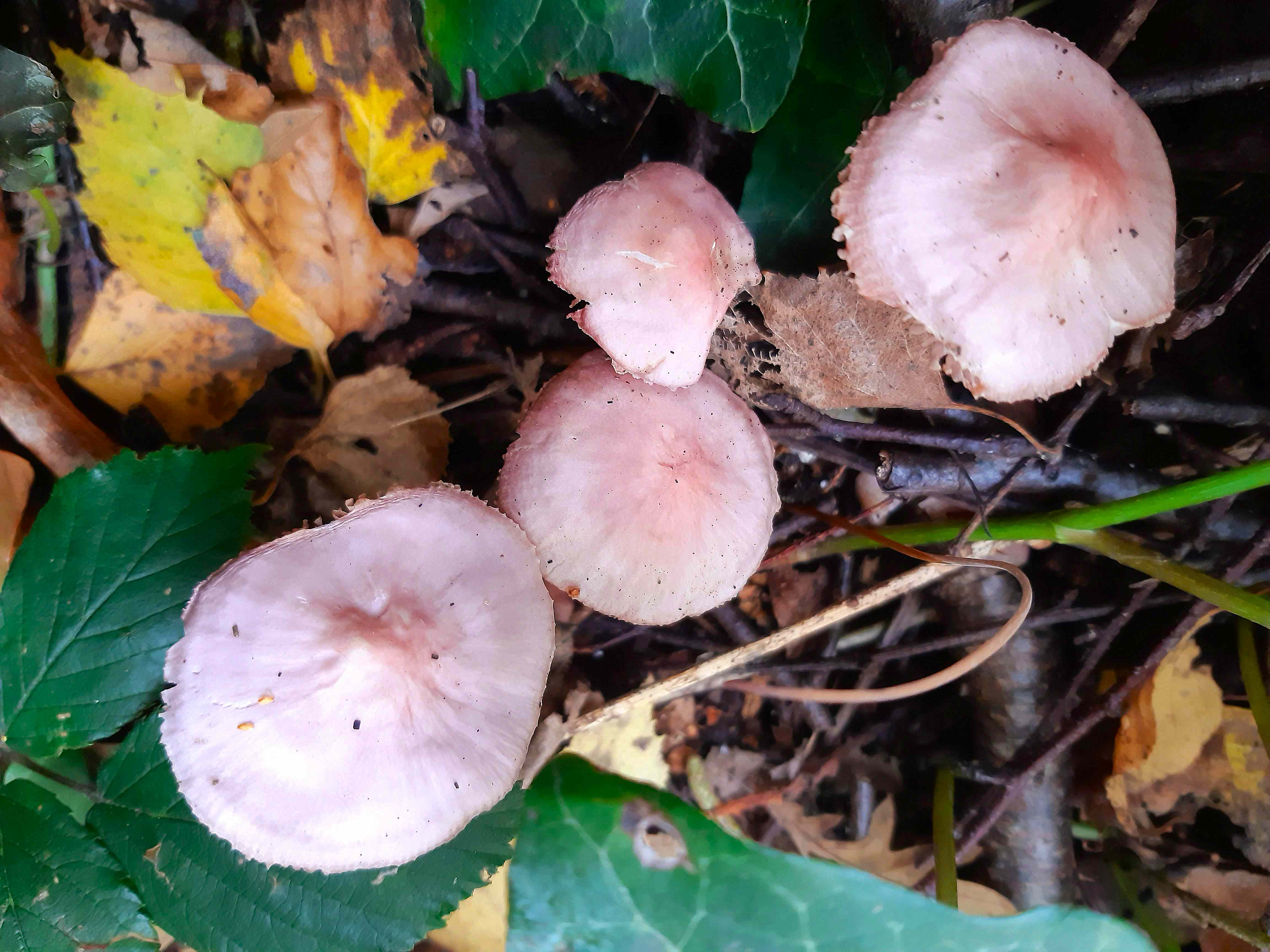
Rosy bonnet, Mycena rosea

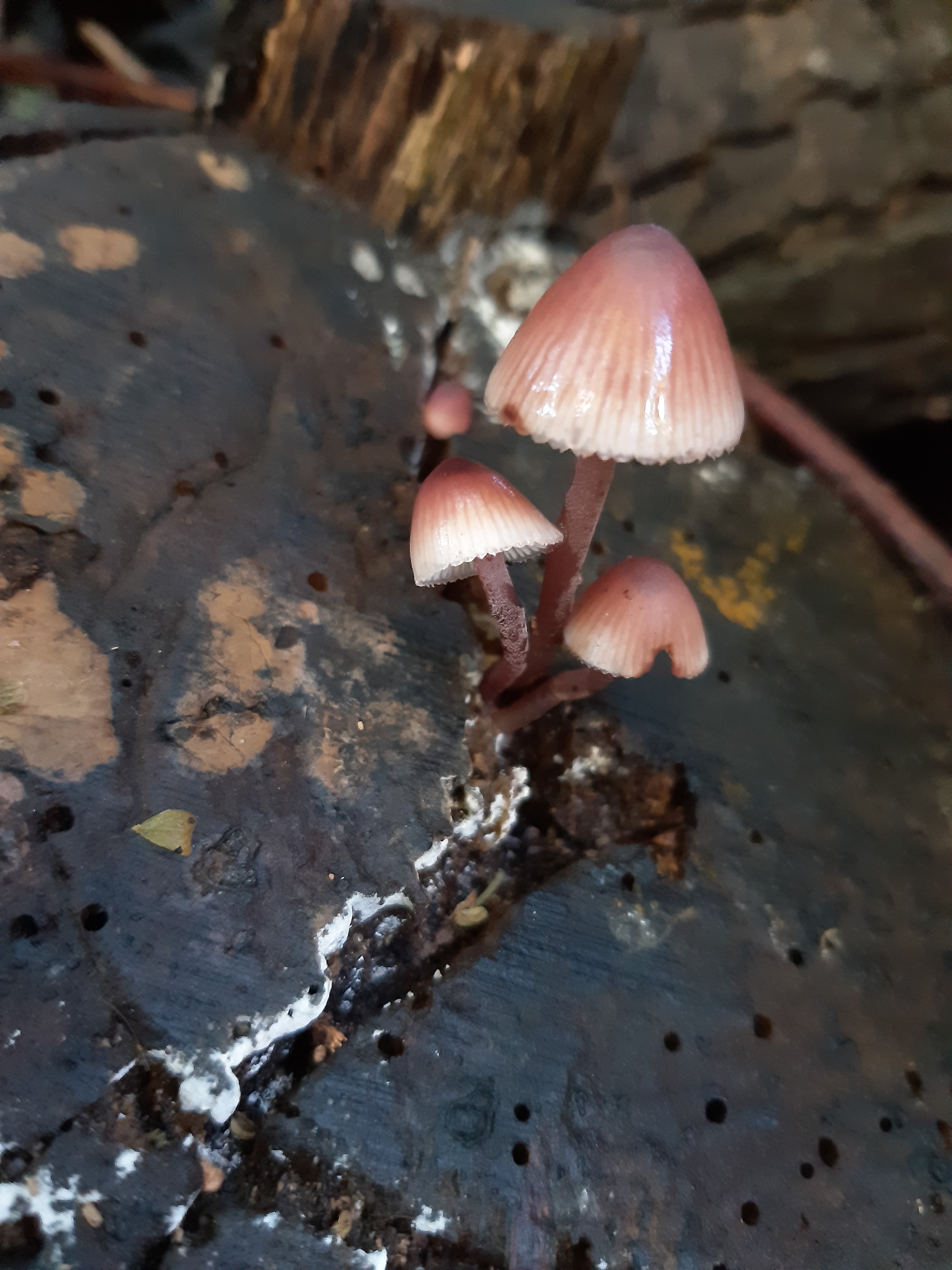
Burgundydrop bonnet, Mycena haematopus

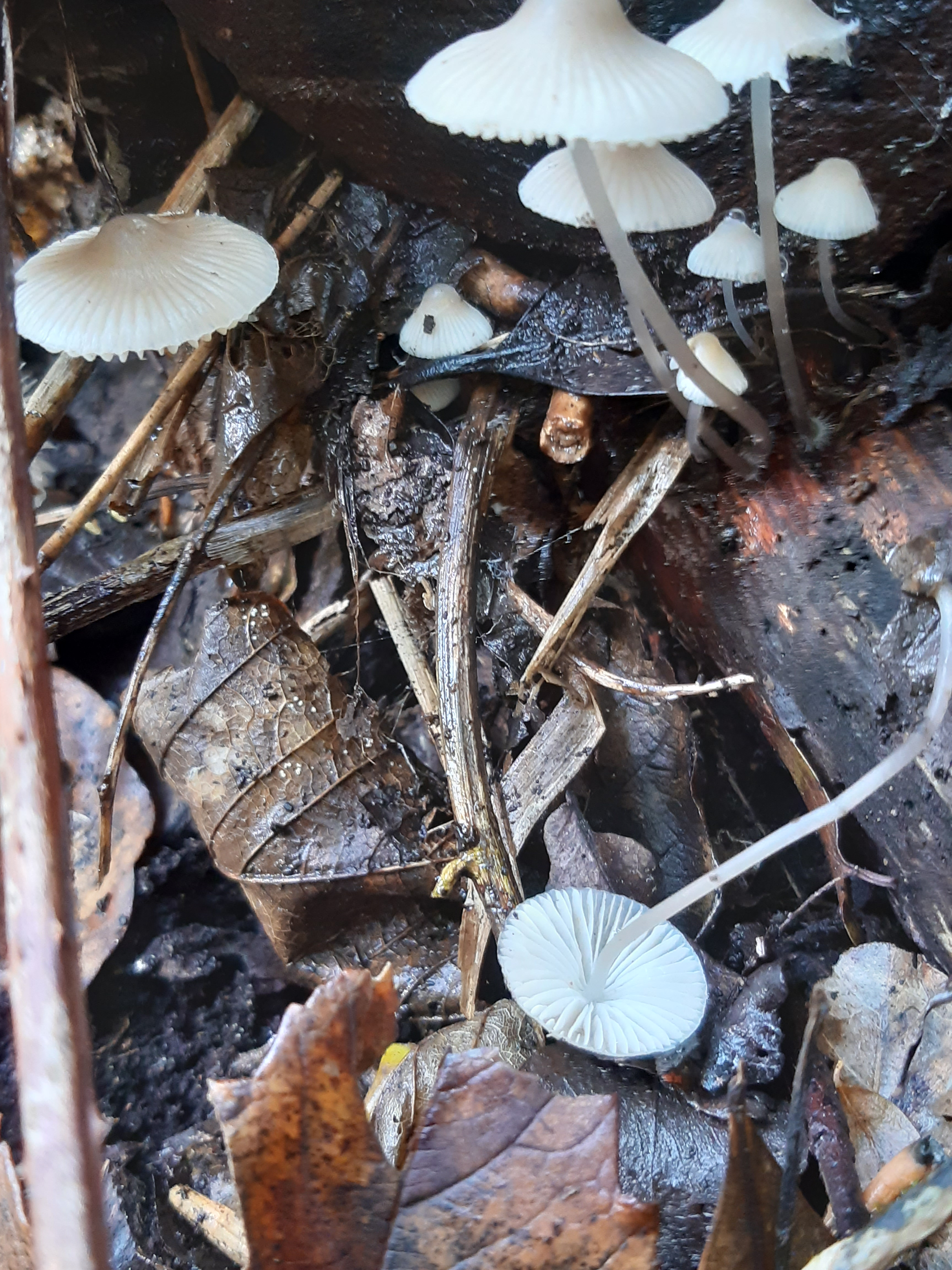
White milking bonnet, Mycena galopus var candida

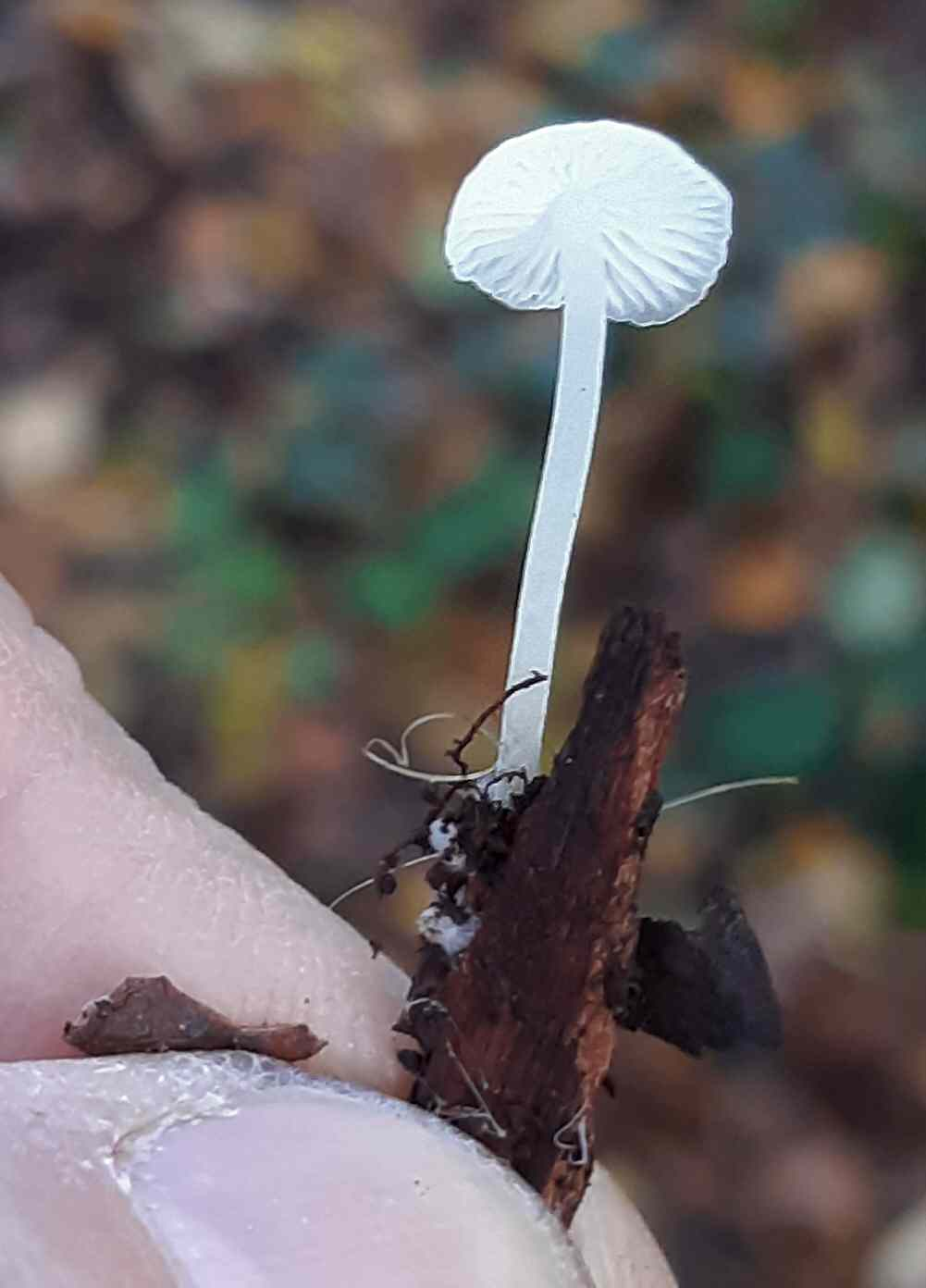
Twig parachute, Marasmiellus ramealis

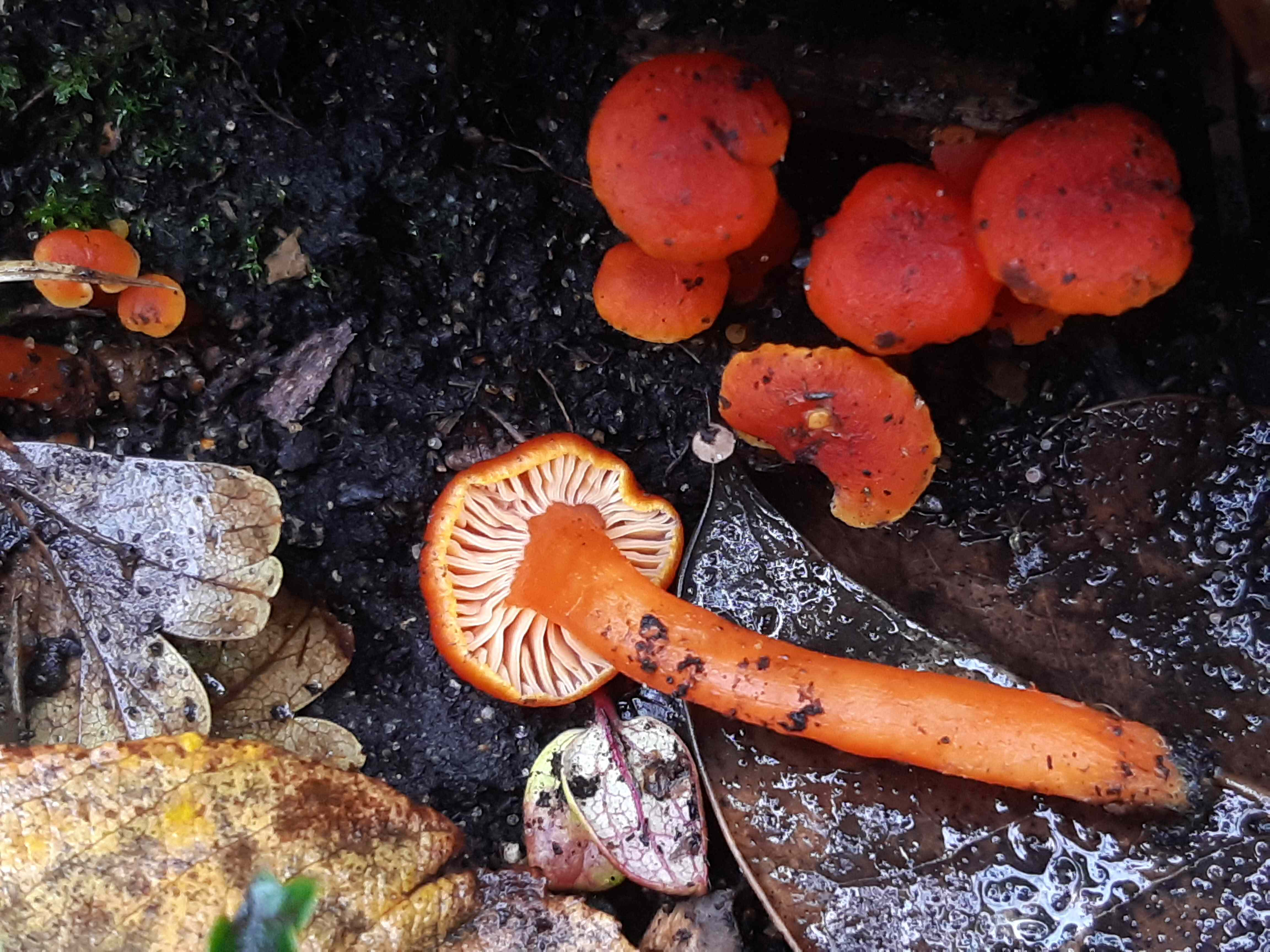
Waxcap fungus, Hygrocybe, cf H. cantharellus

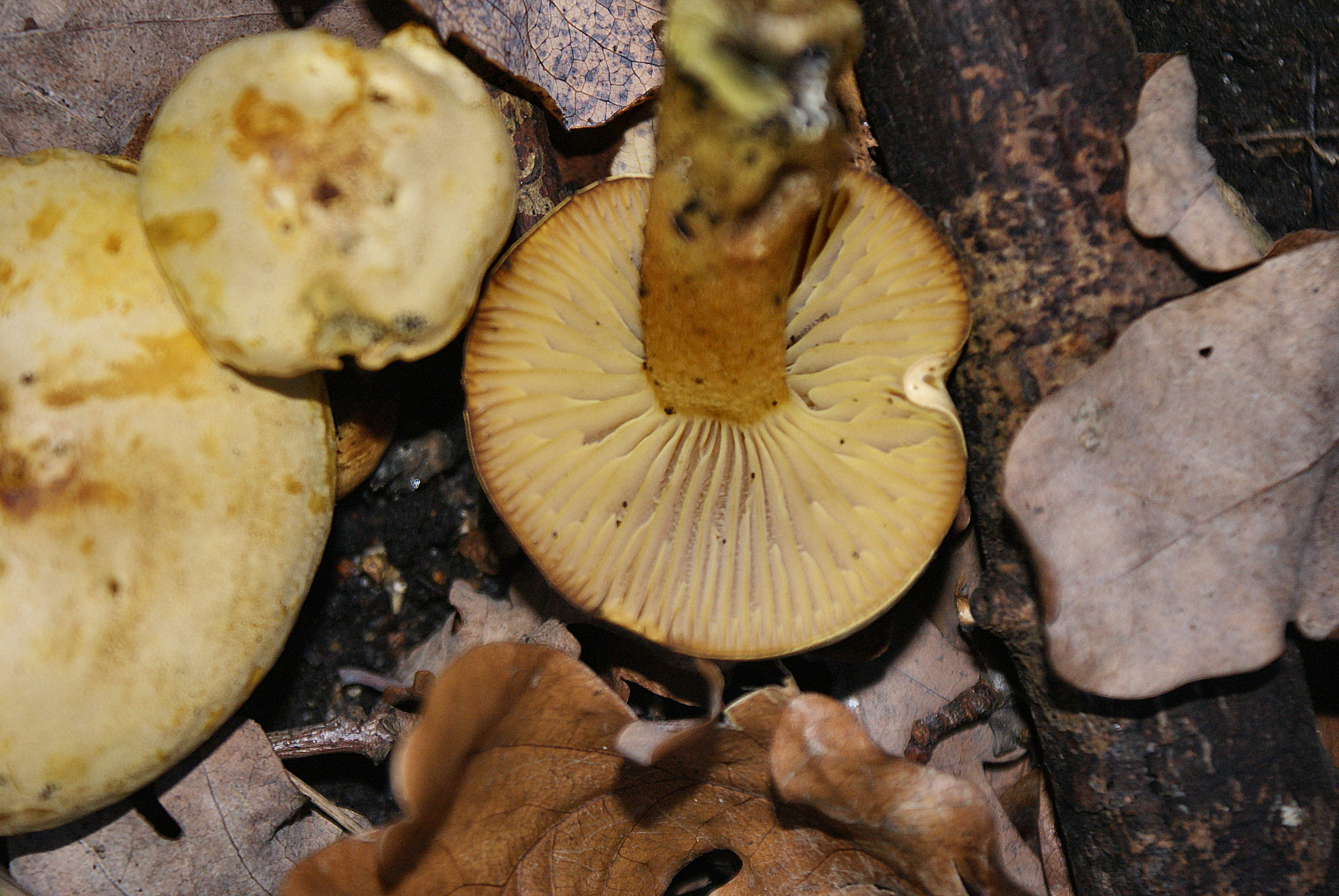
Sulphur Knight, Tricholoma sulphureum

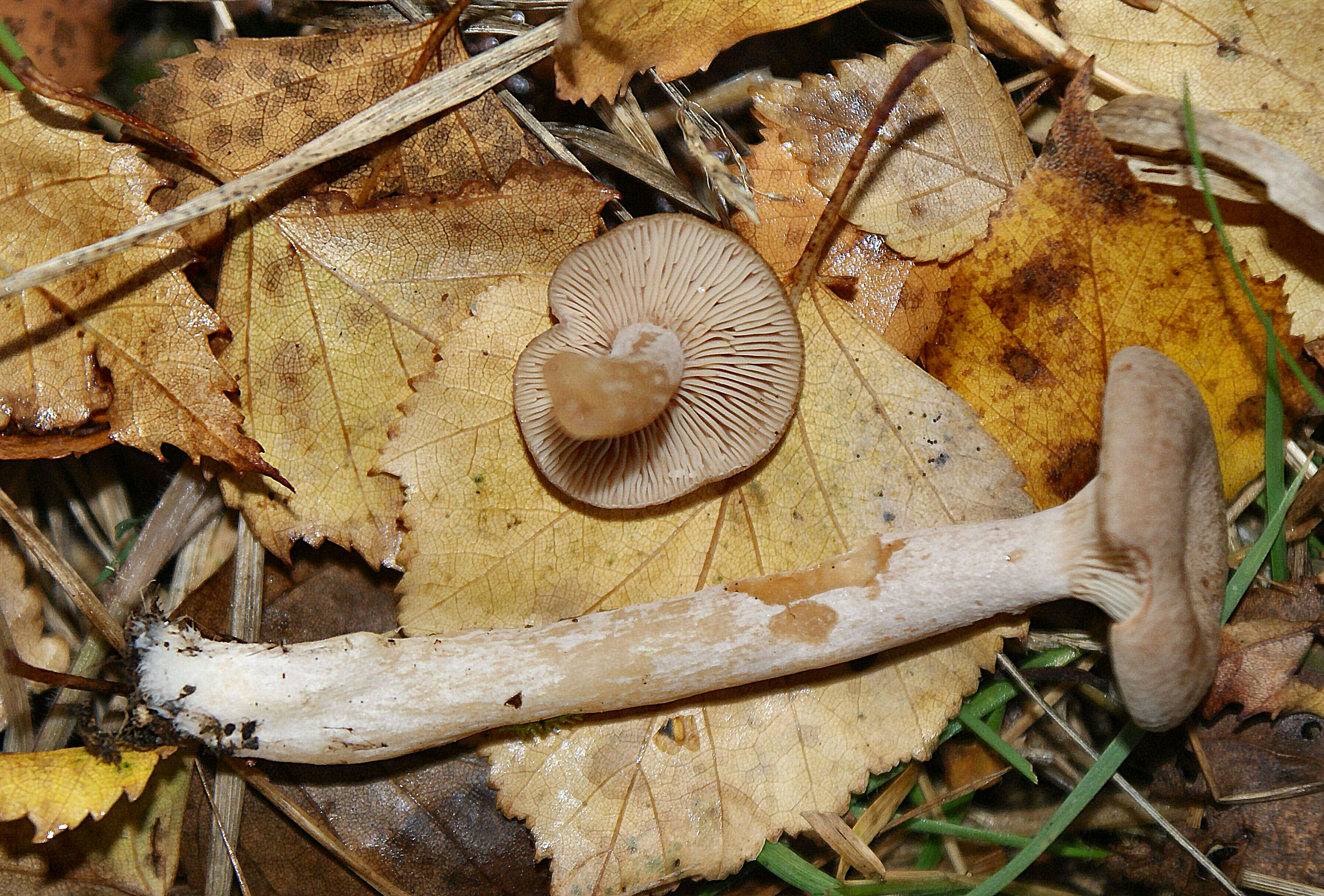
Coconut-scented milkcap, Lactarius glyciosmus

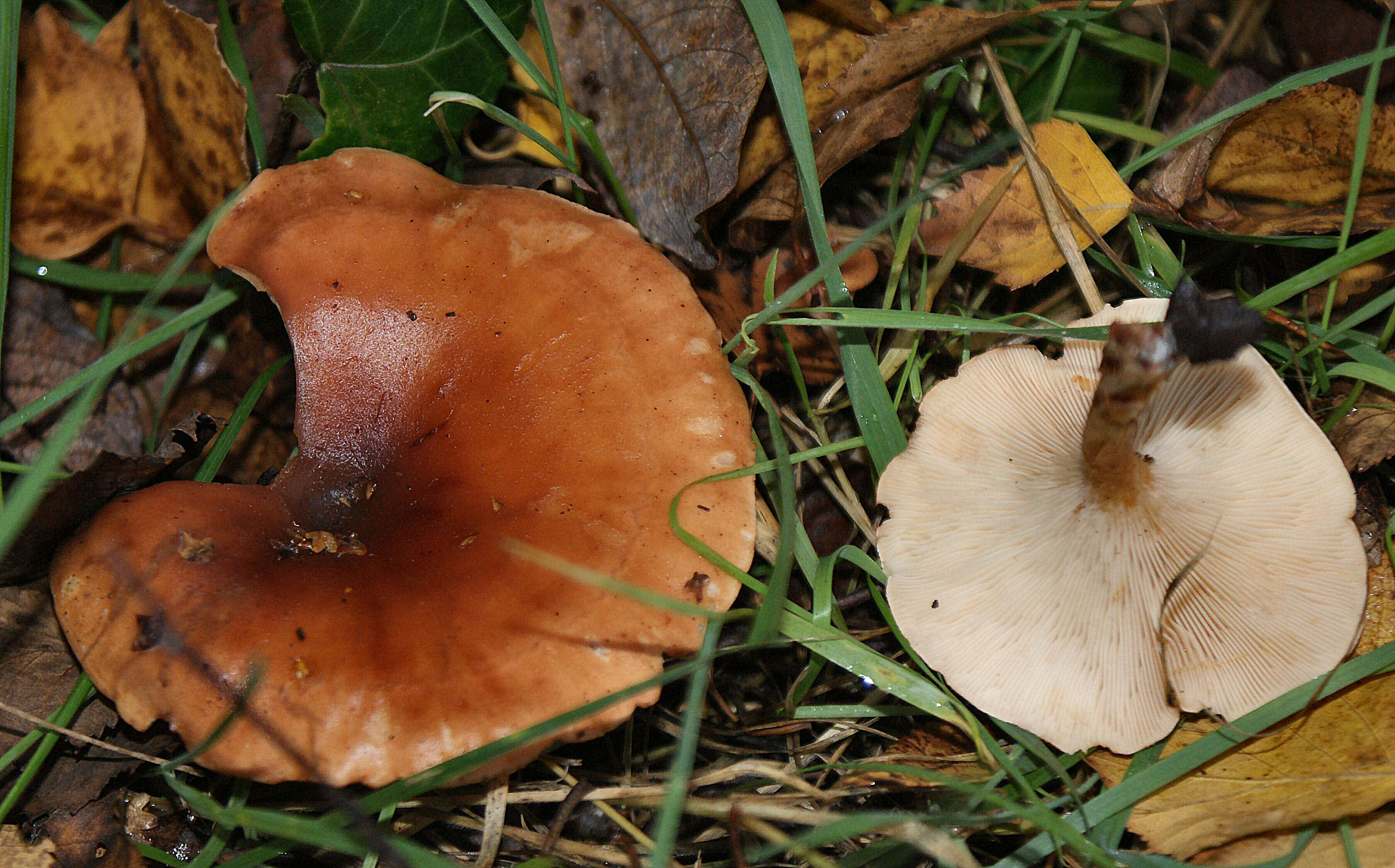
Tawny funnel, Lepista inversa

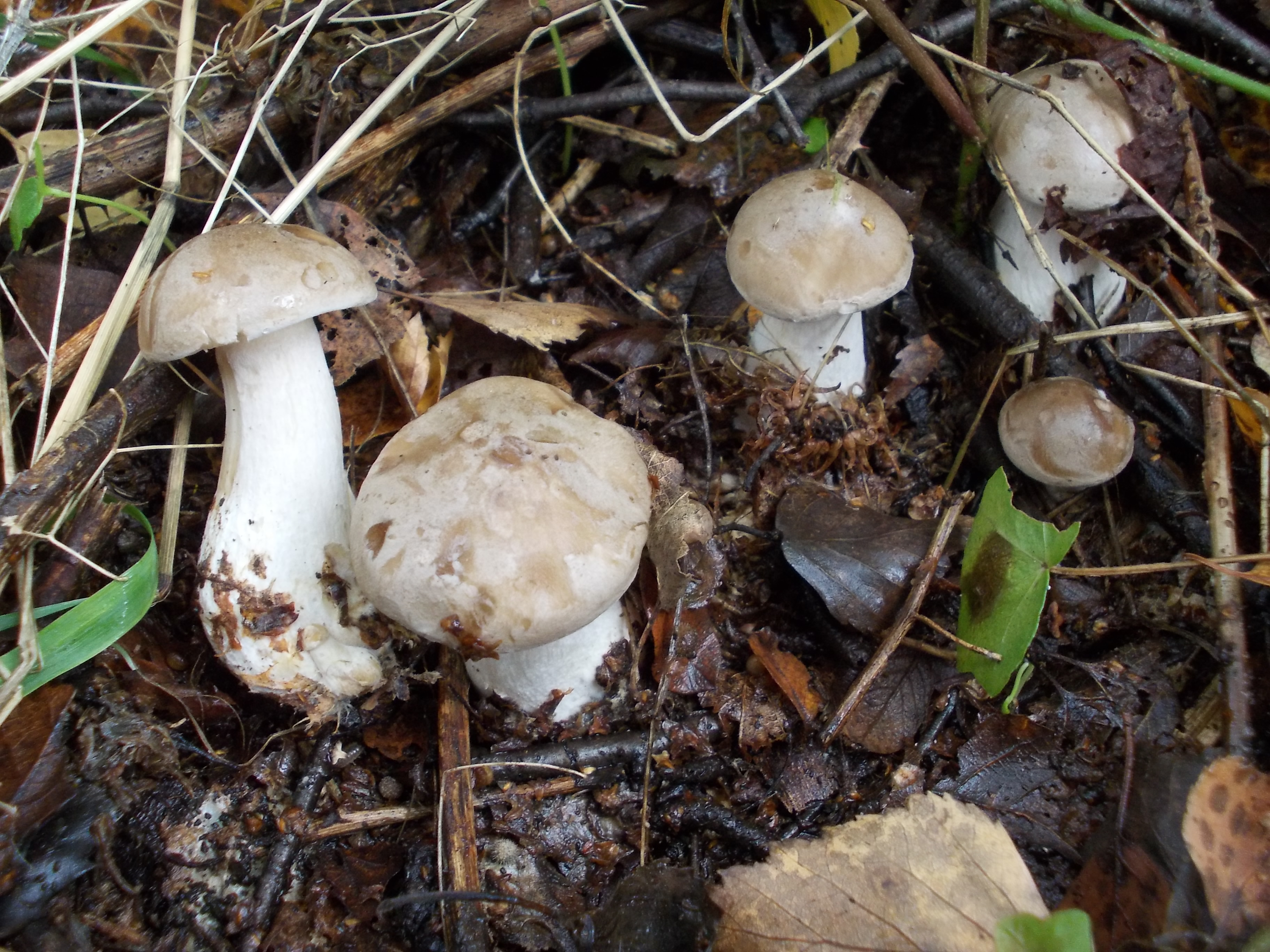
Charcoal burner, Russula cyanoxantha

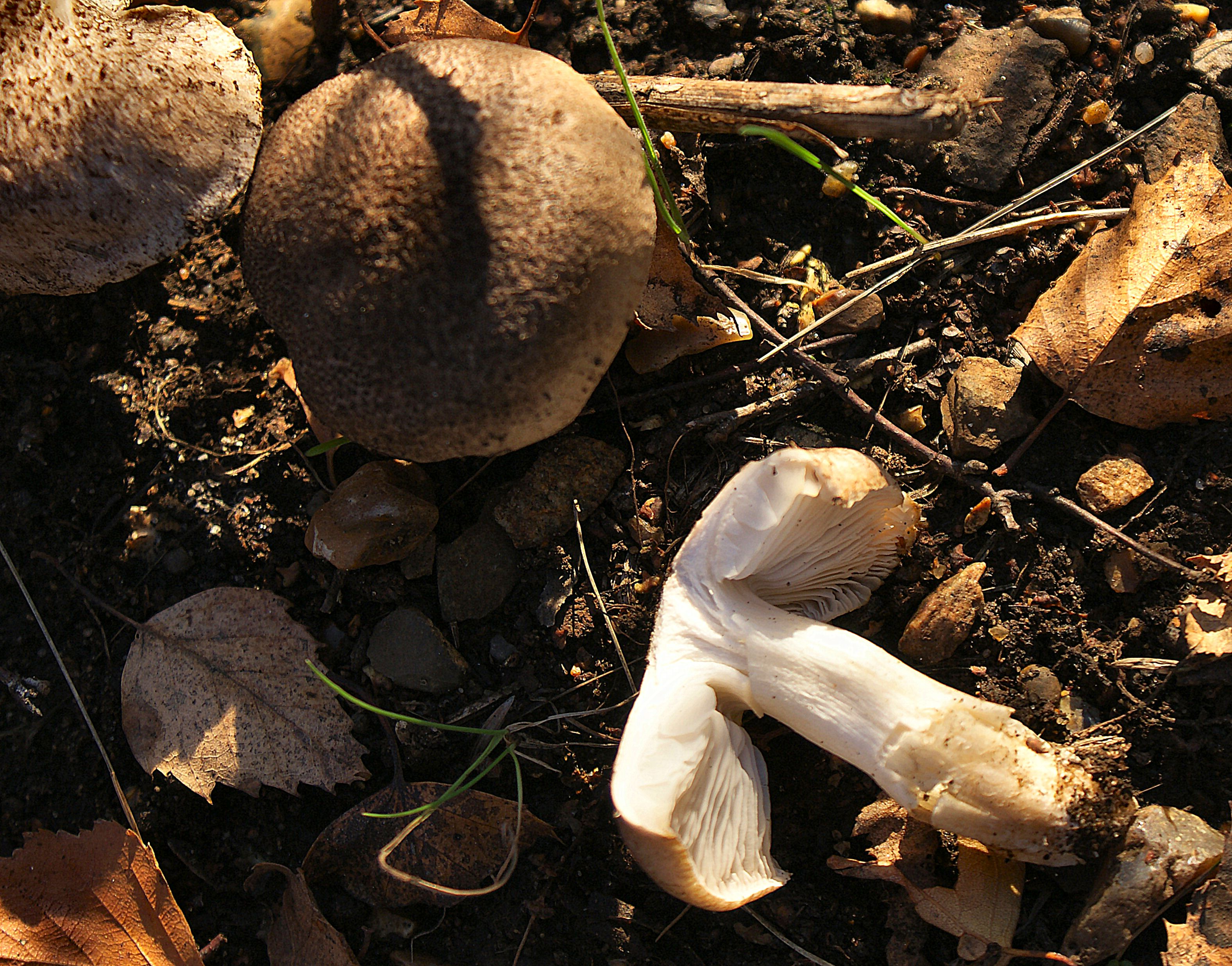
Ashen knight, Tricholoma virgatum

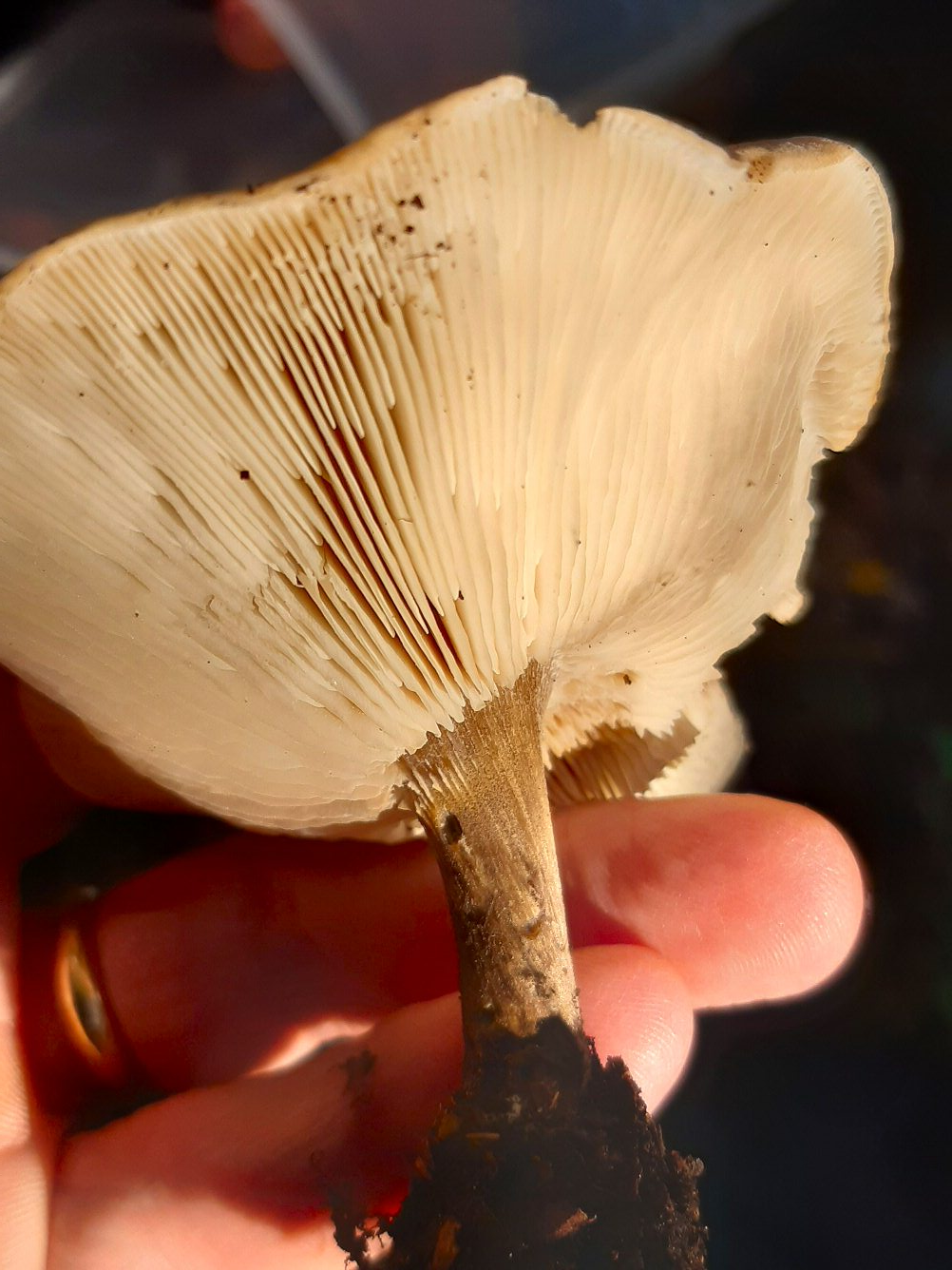
Birch knight, Tricholoma fulvum

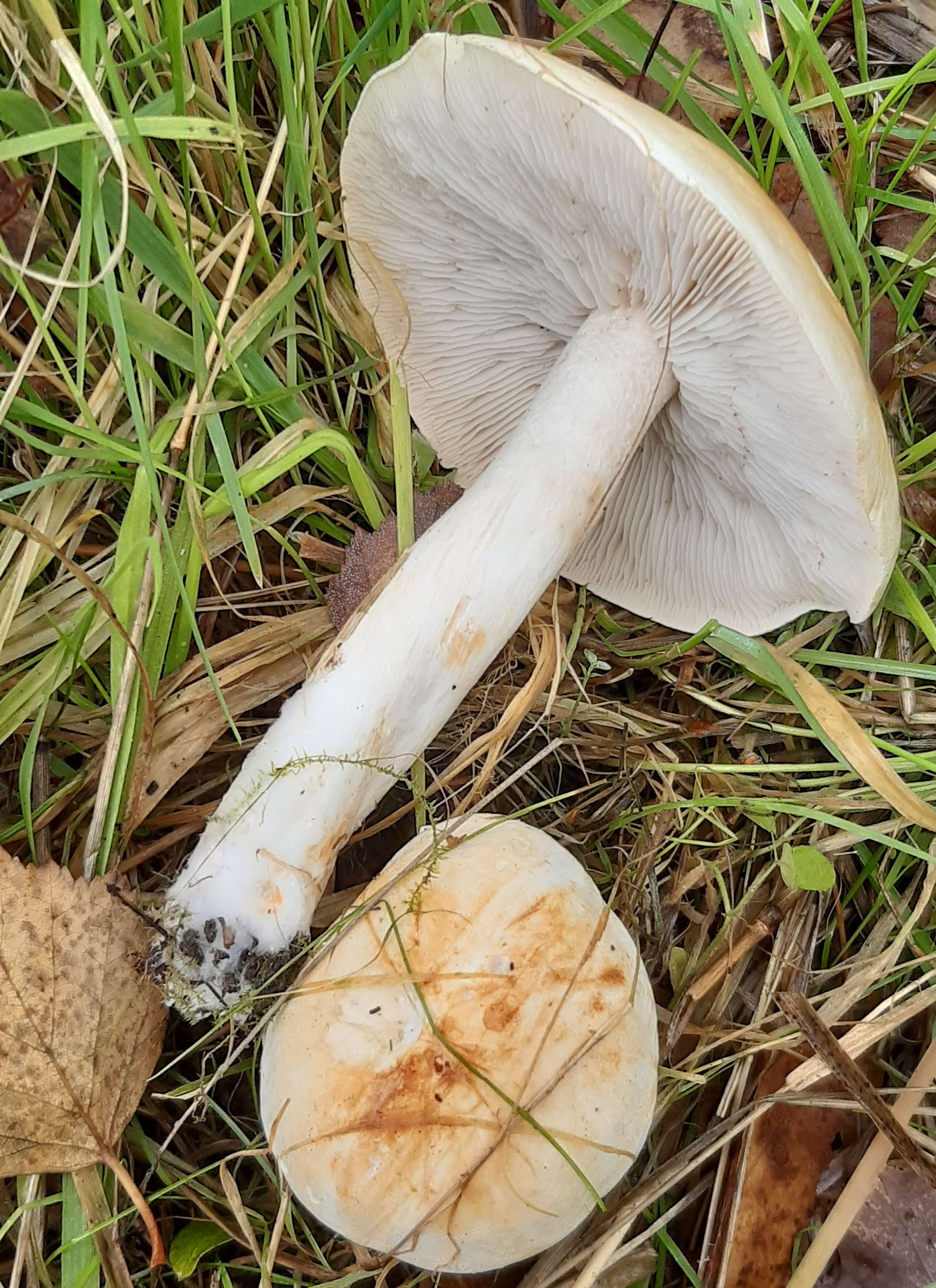
White knight, Tricholoma 'album' in anthill meadow

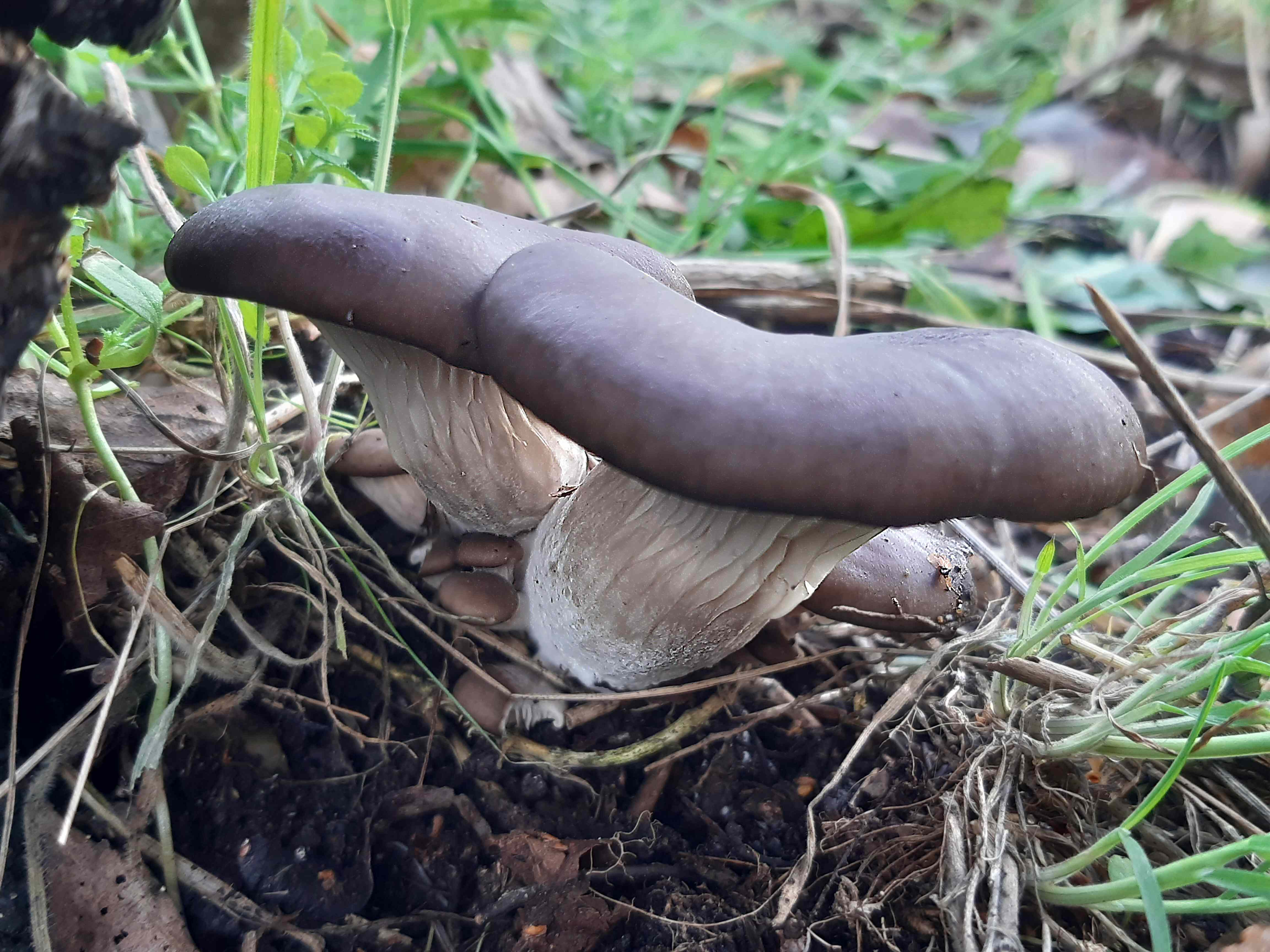
Oyster mushrooms, Pleurotus ostreatus var columbinus in winter

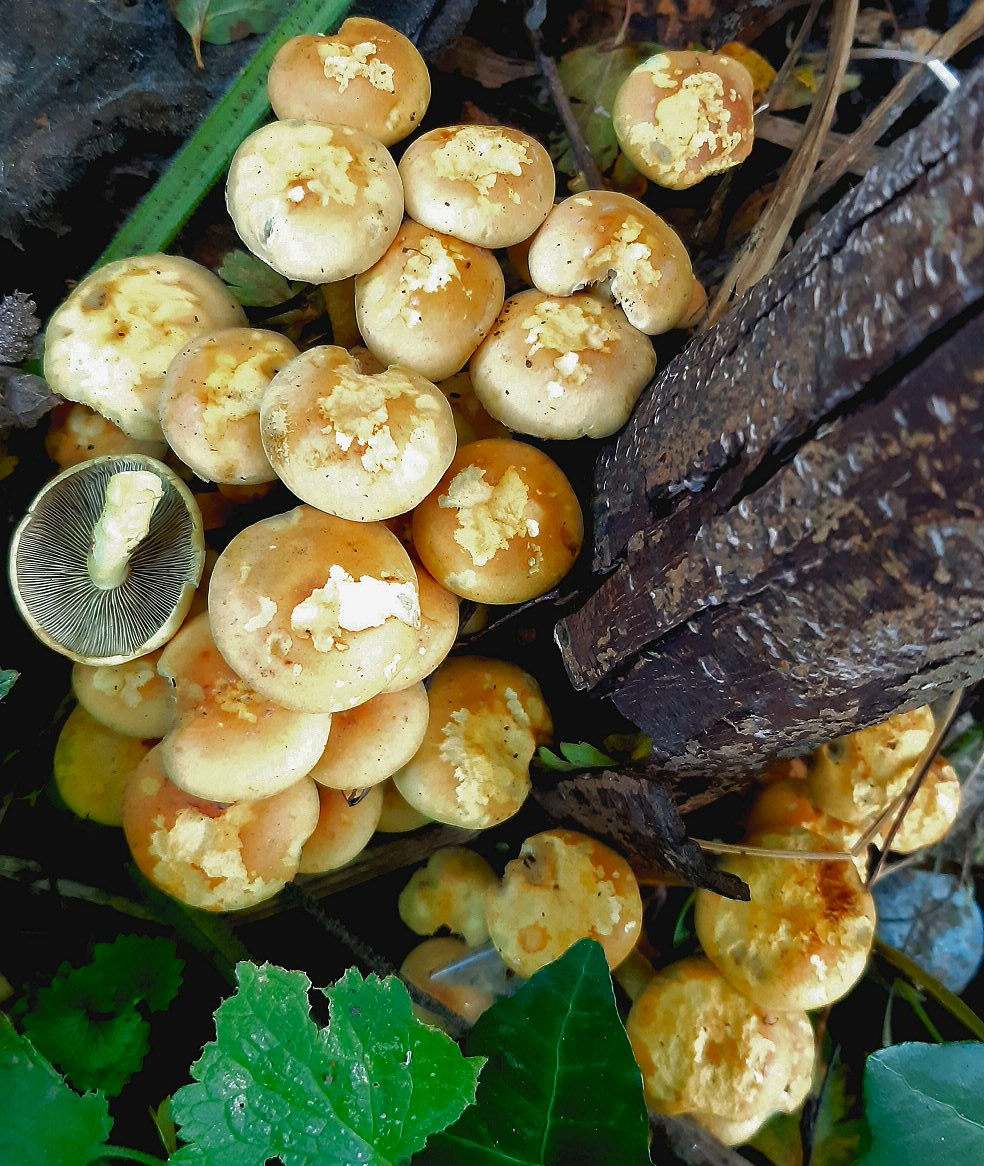
Hypholoma fasciculare, sulphur tuft on Birch loggery

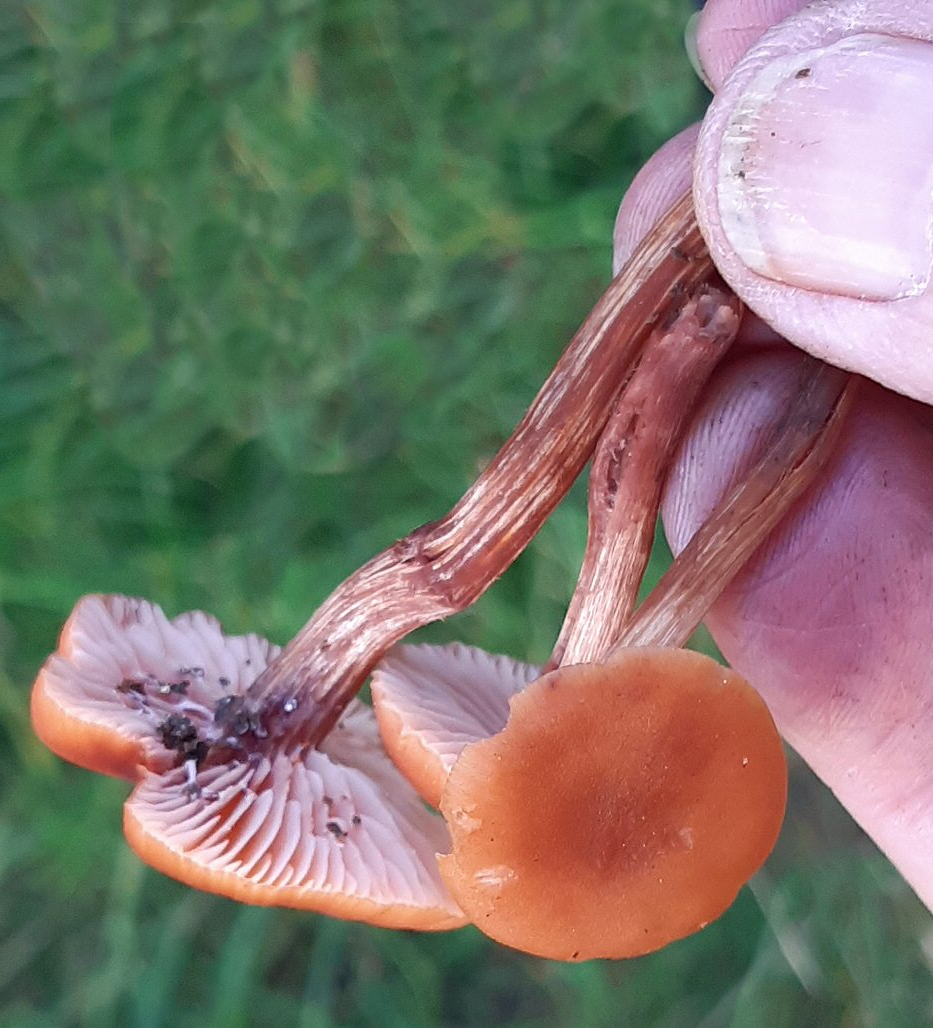
Laccaria proxima, the scurfy deceiver

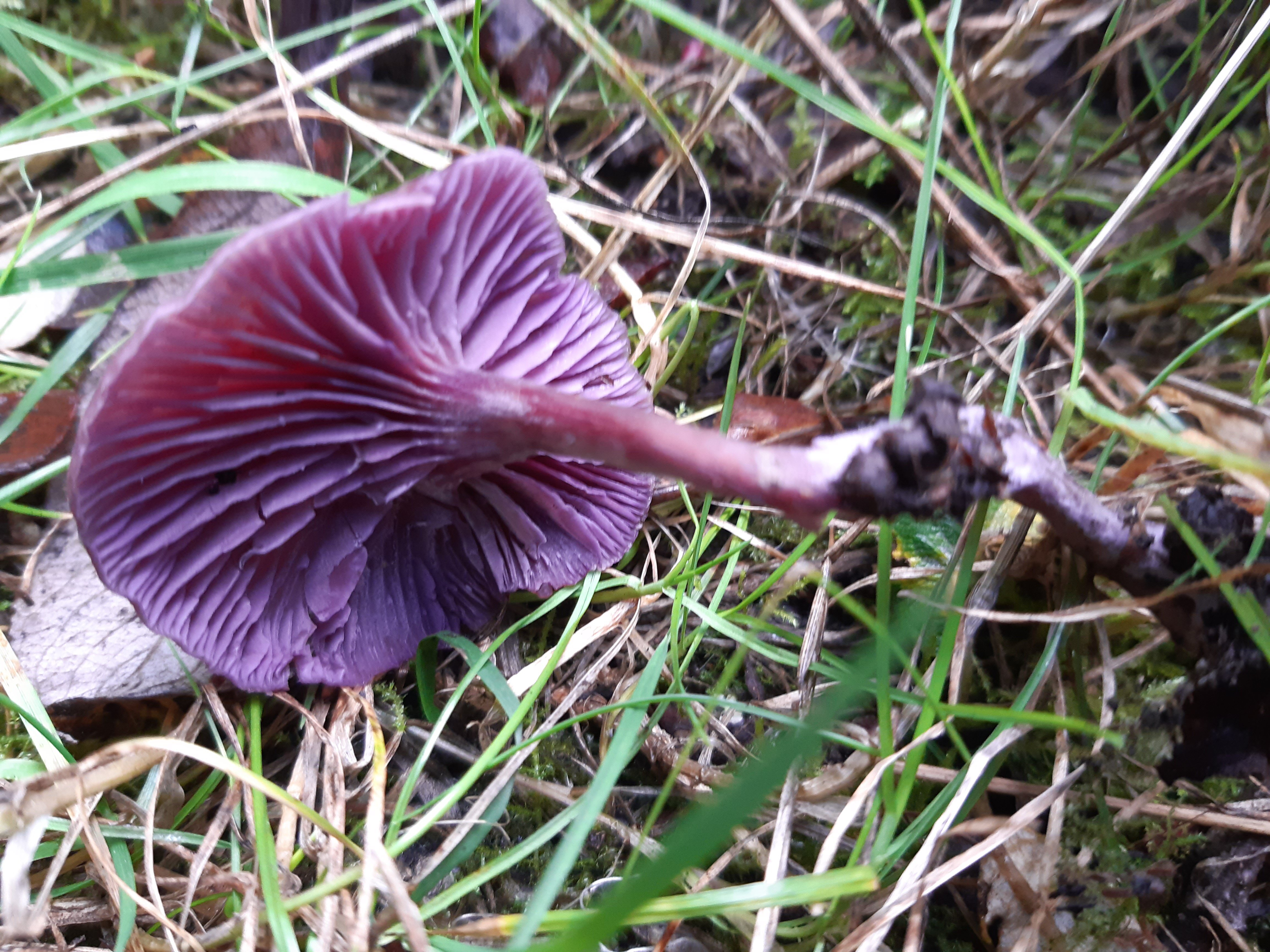
Laccaria amethystina, amethyst deceiver

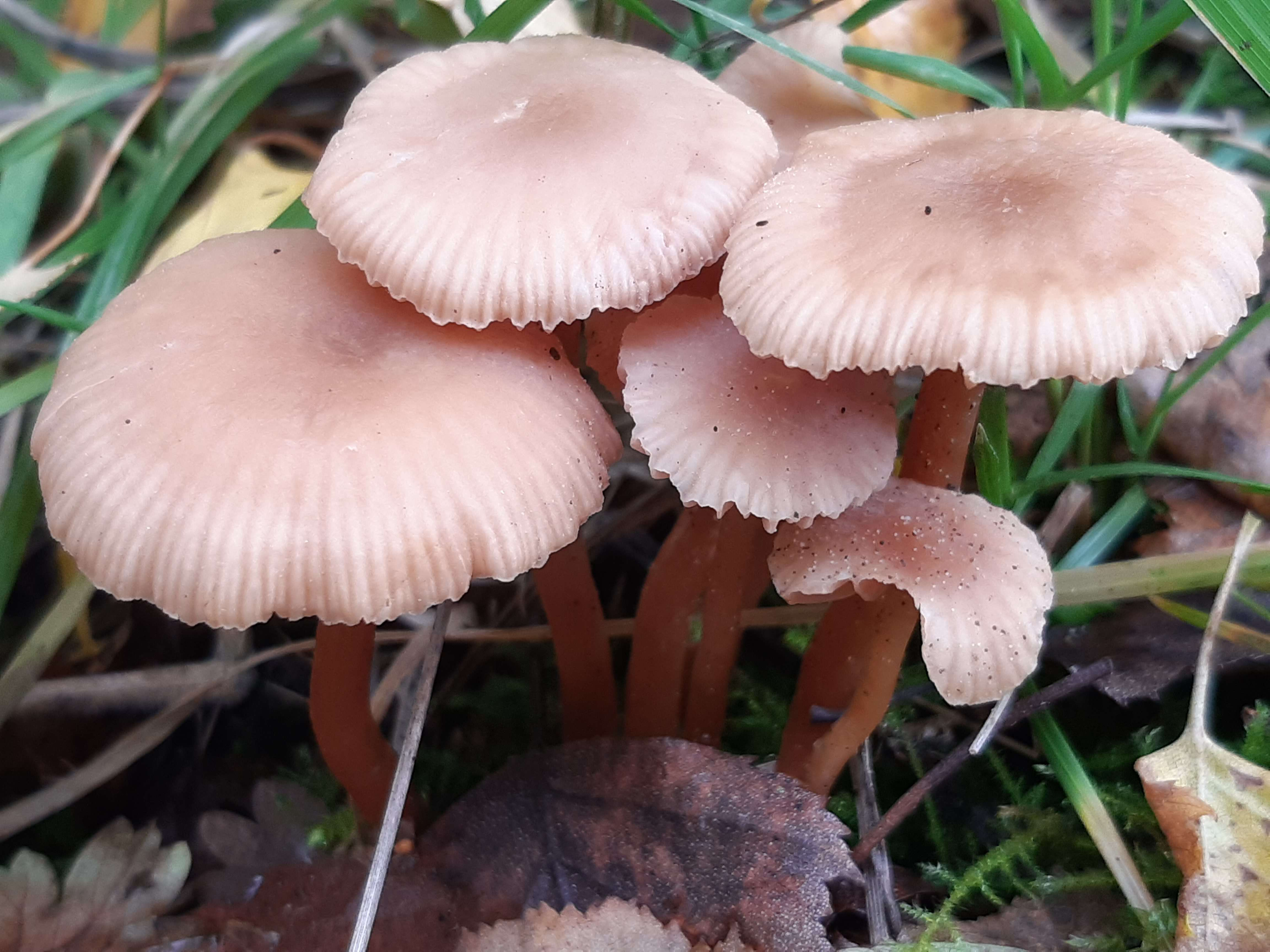
Laccaria laccata - the deceiver

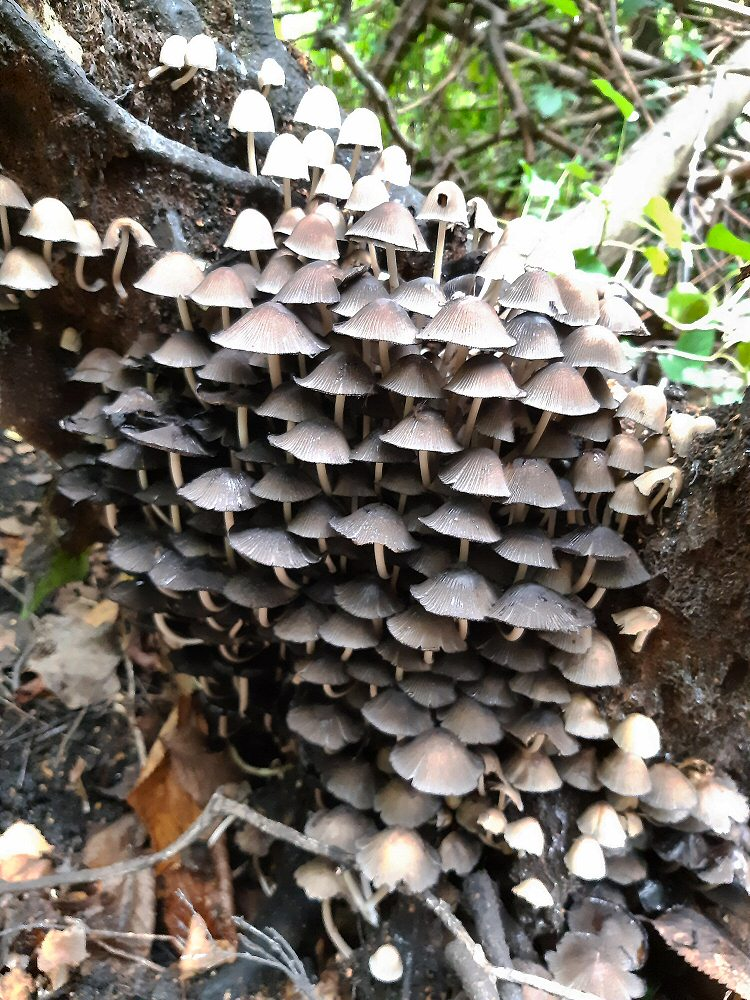
Fairy inkcap, Coprinellus disseminatus, swarm on stump in forest school

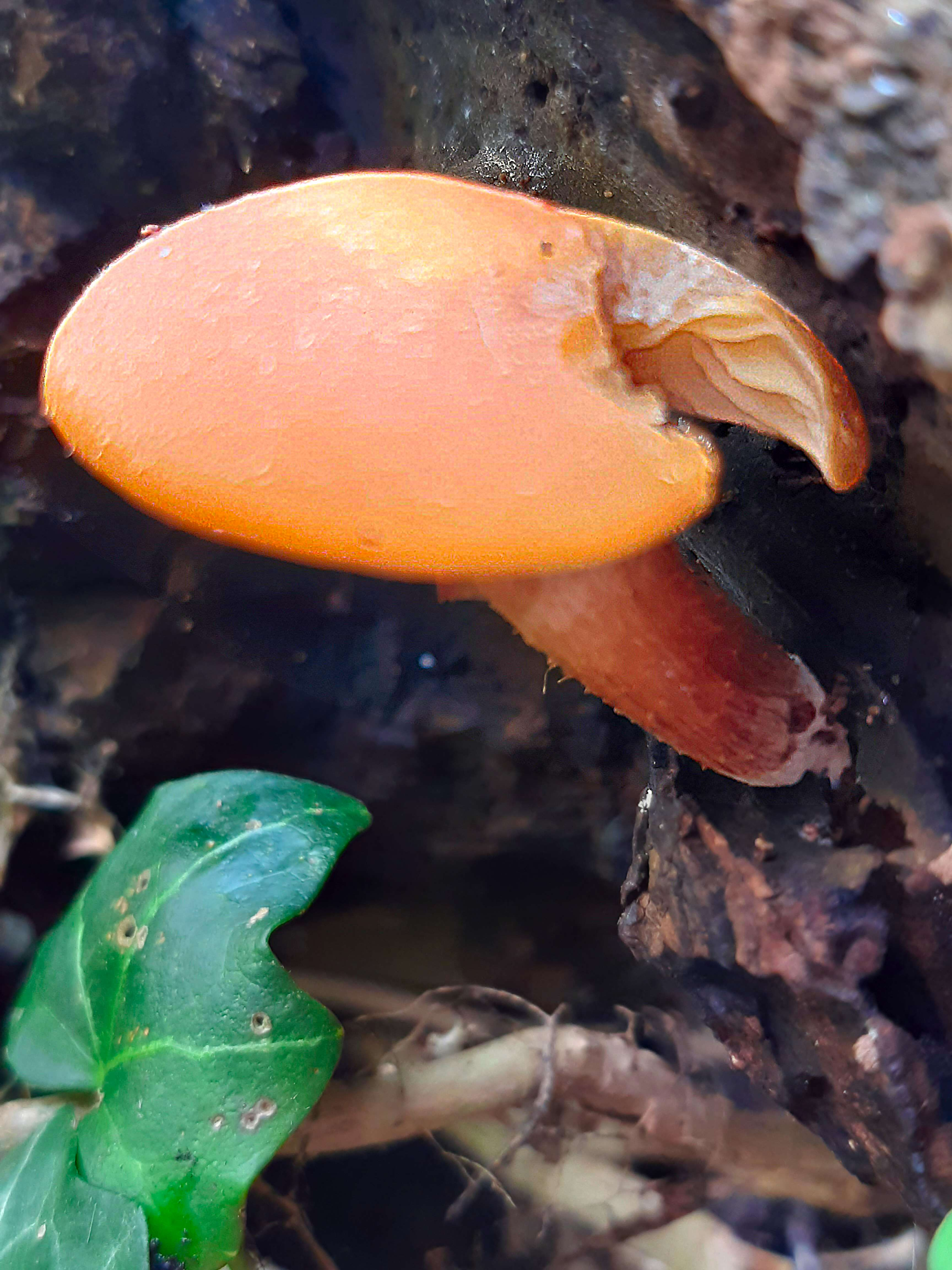
Wrinkled peach, Rhodotus palmatus, on loggery near hut

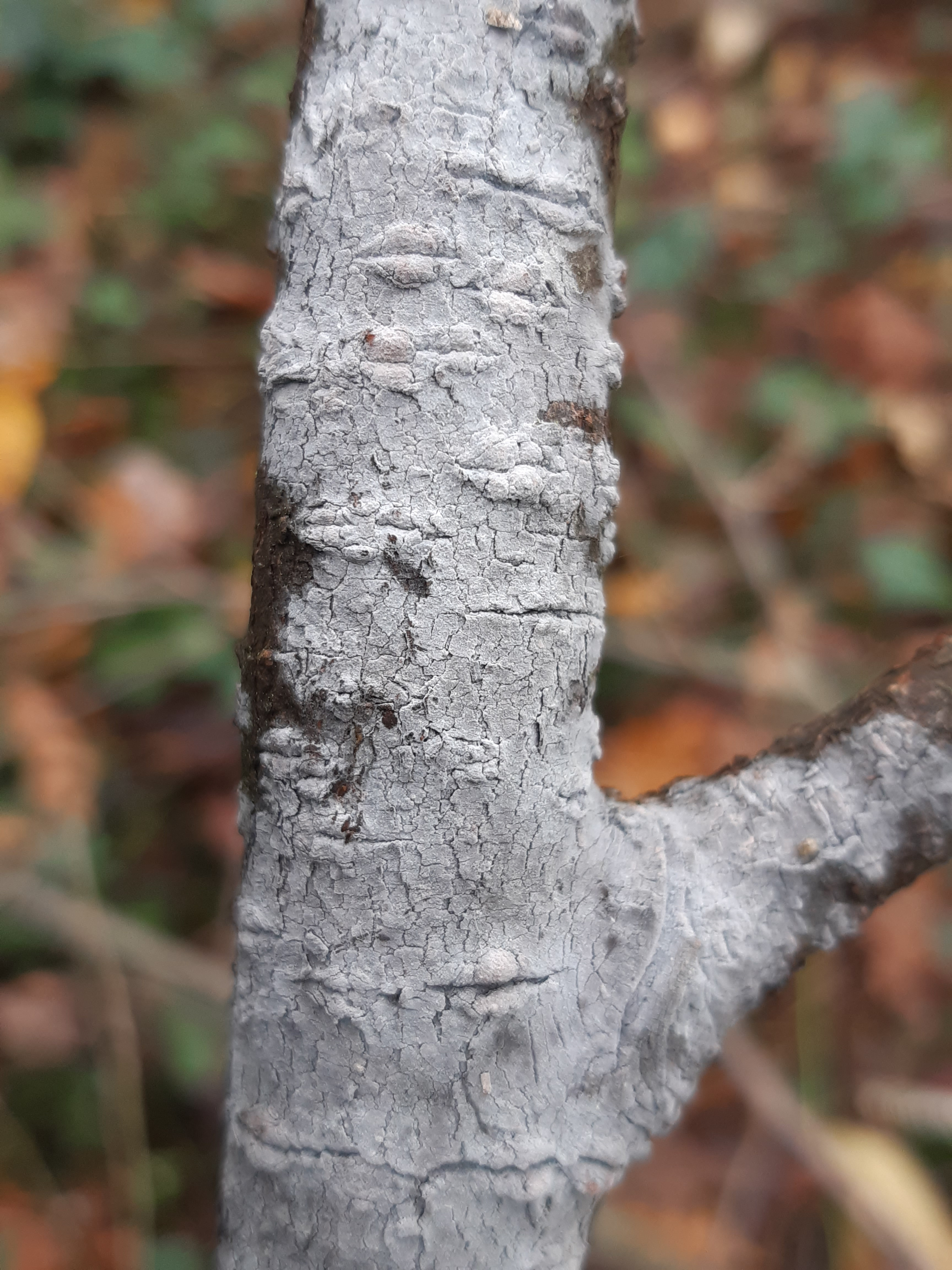
Elder Whitewash, Hyphodontia sambuci, on cherry
Puffballs, earthstars, jelly fungi

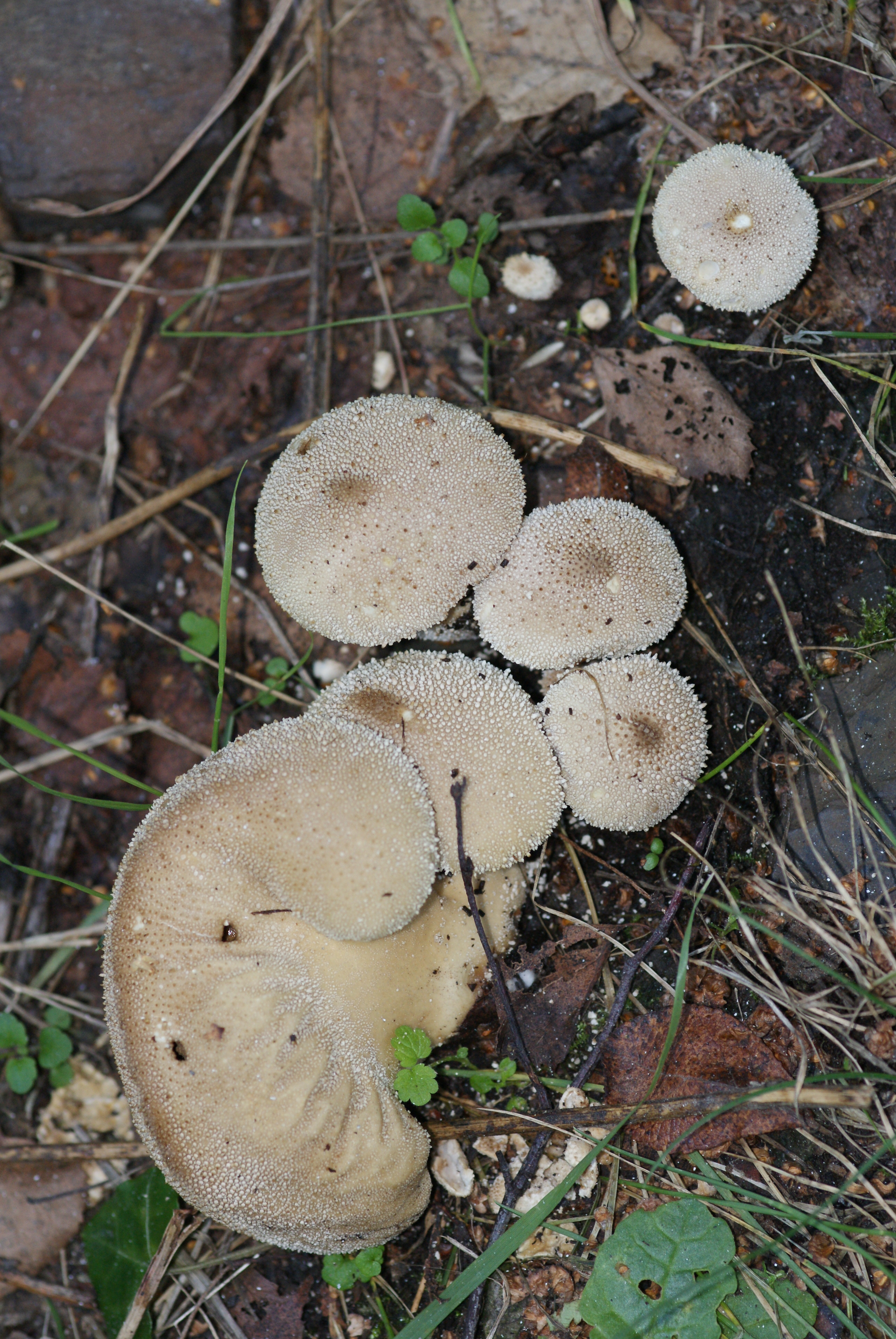
Puffballs, Lycoperdon perlatum

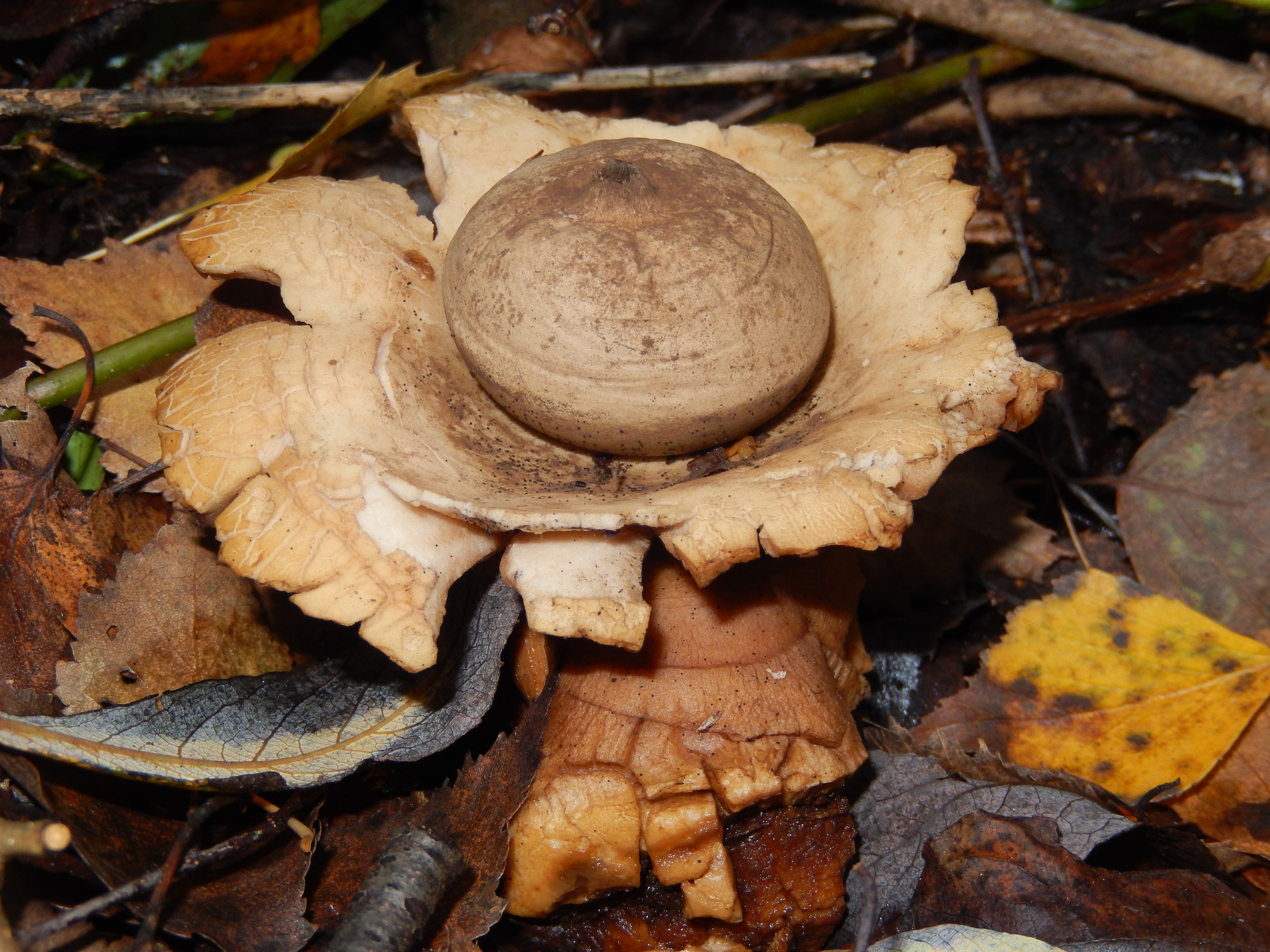
Collared earthstar, Geastrum triplex

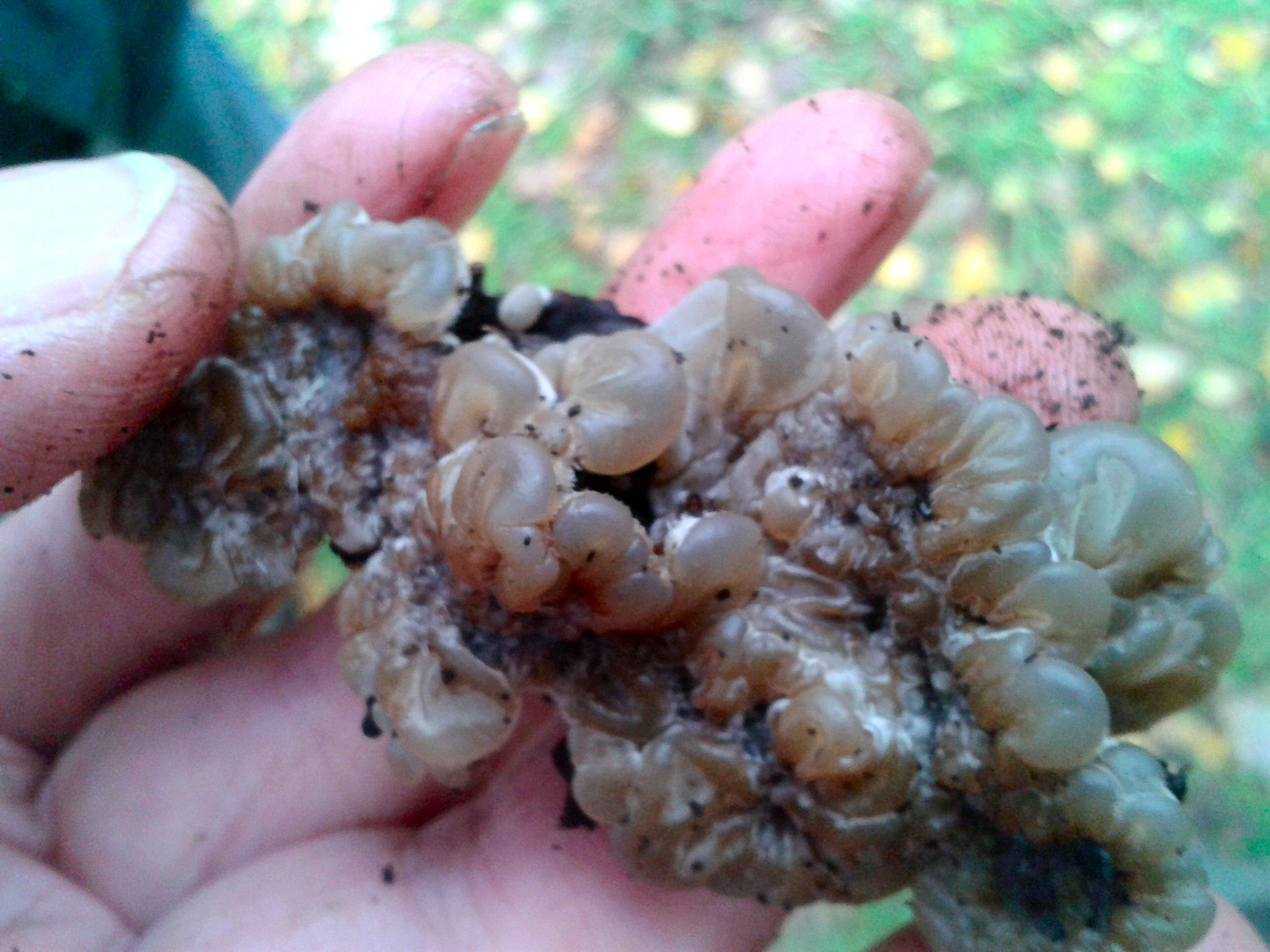
Tripe fungus, Auricularia mesenterica

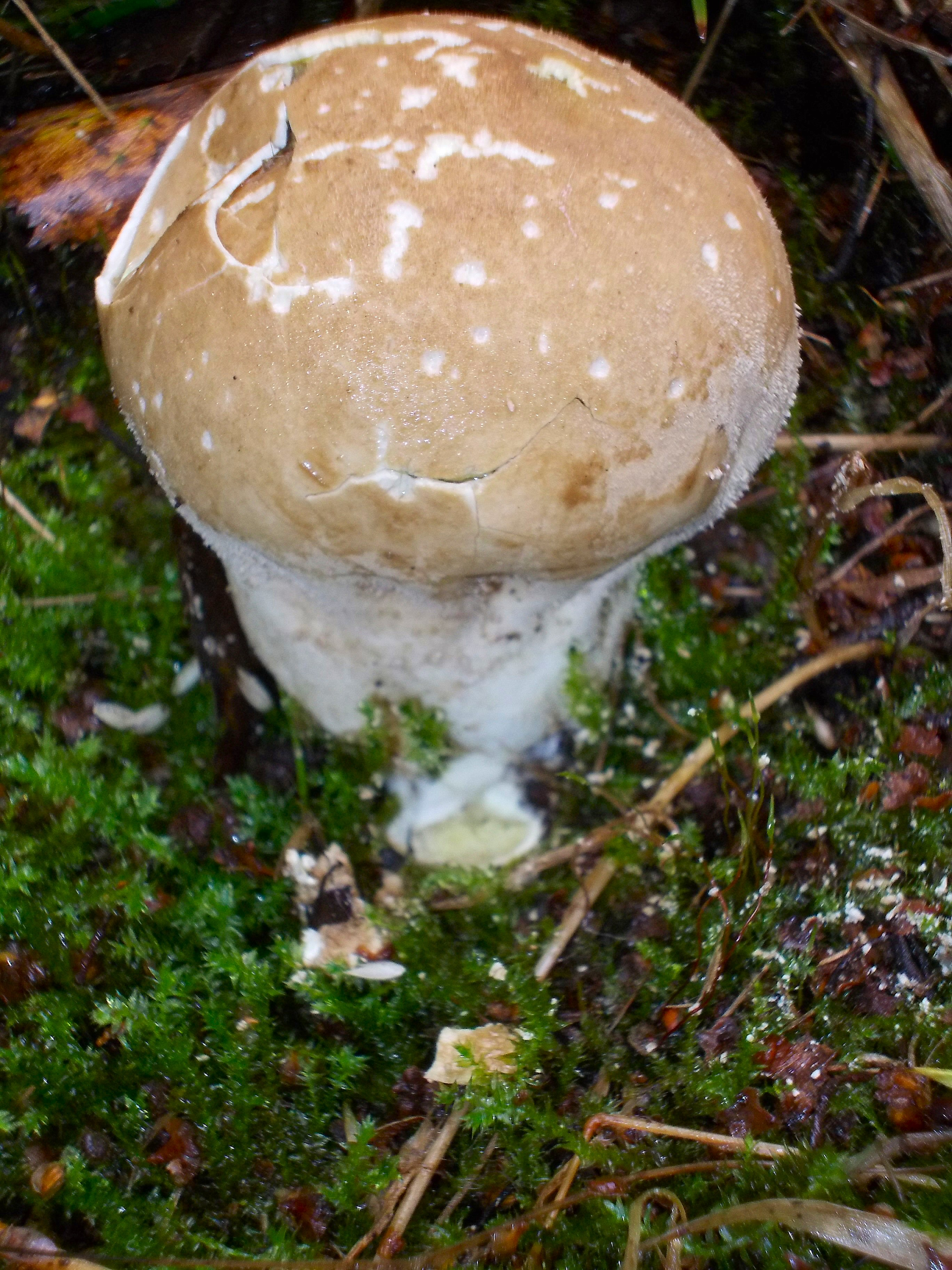
Pestle puffball Handkea (Calvatia) excipuliformis

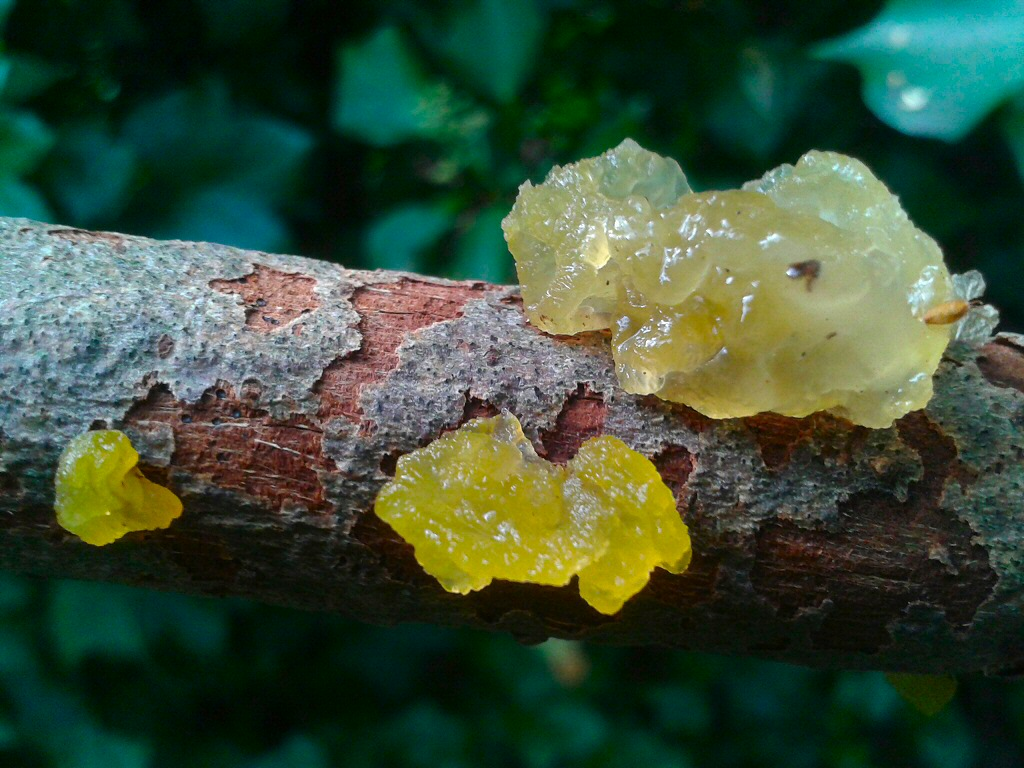
Brain jelly Tremella mesenterica

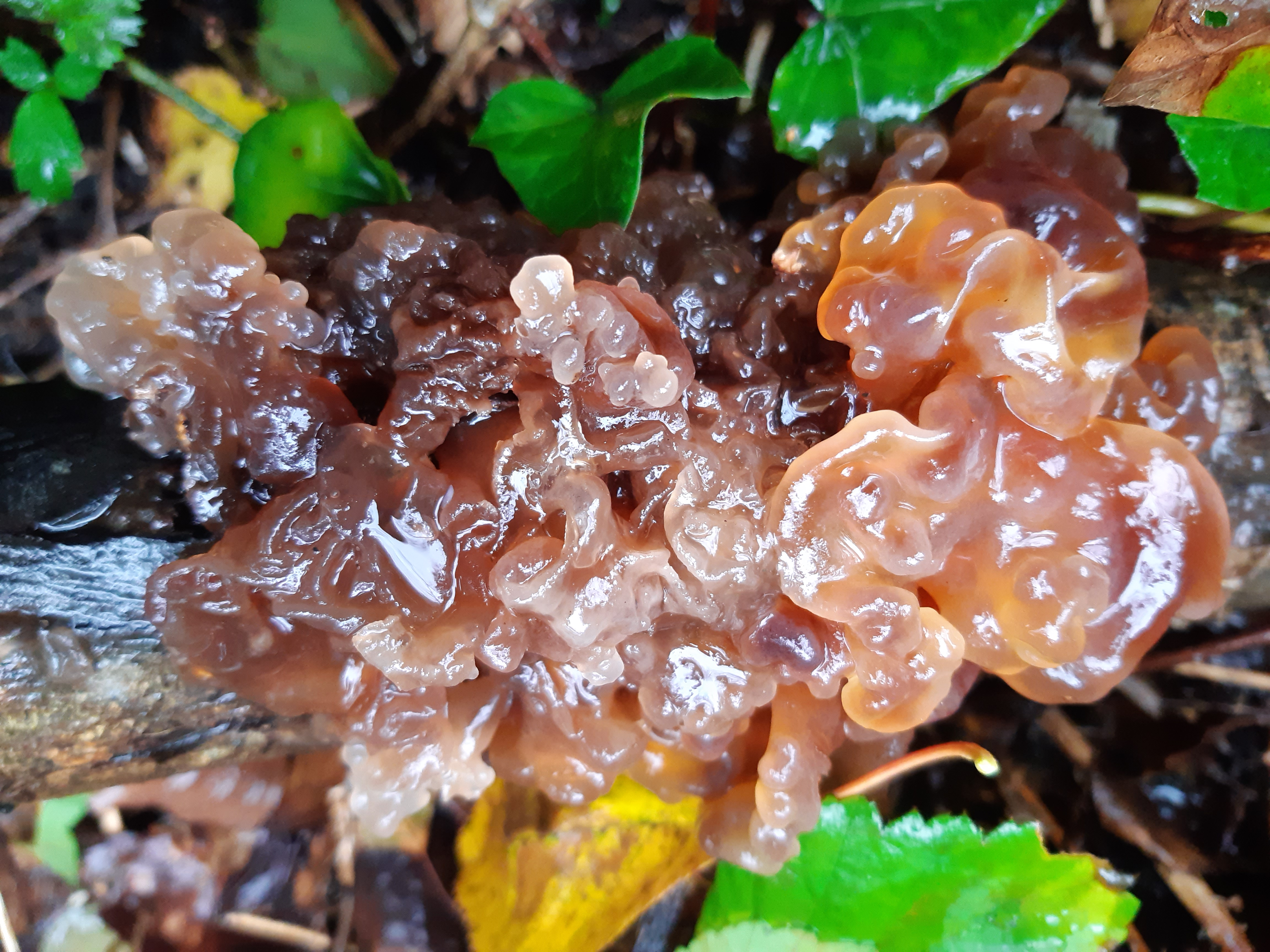
Yellow brain, Tremella 'foliacea'

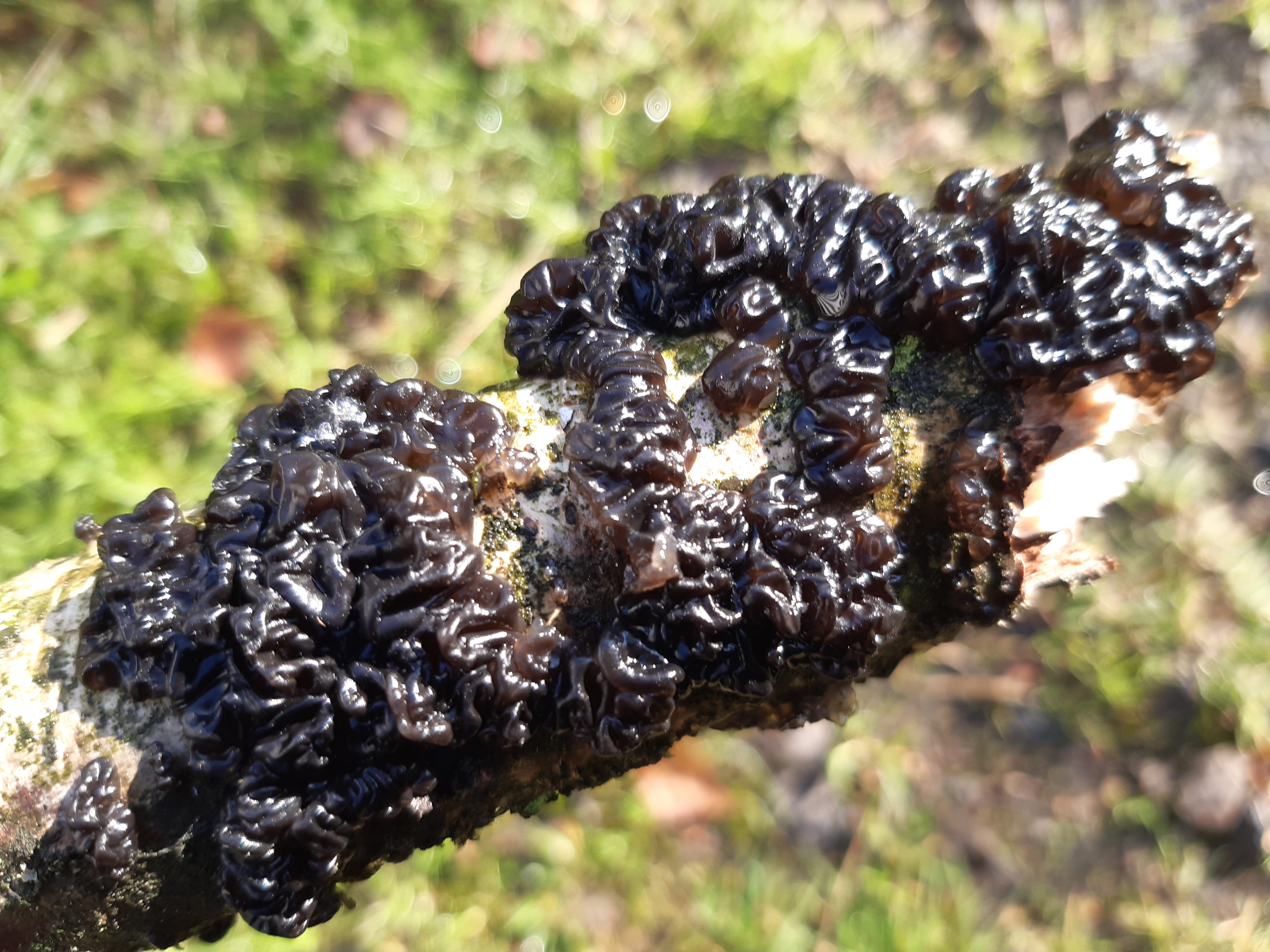
Warlock's butter, Exidia nigricans, on rotting birch branch
Clubs, corals

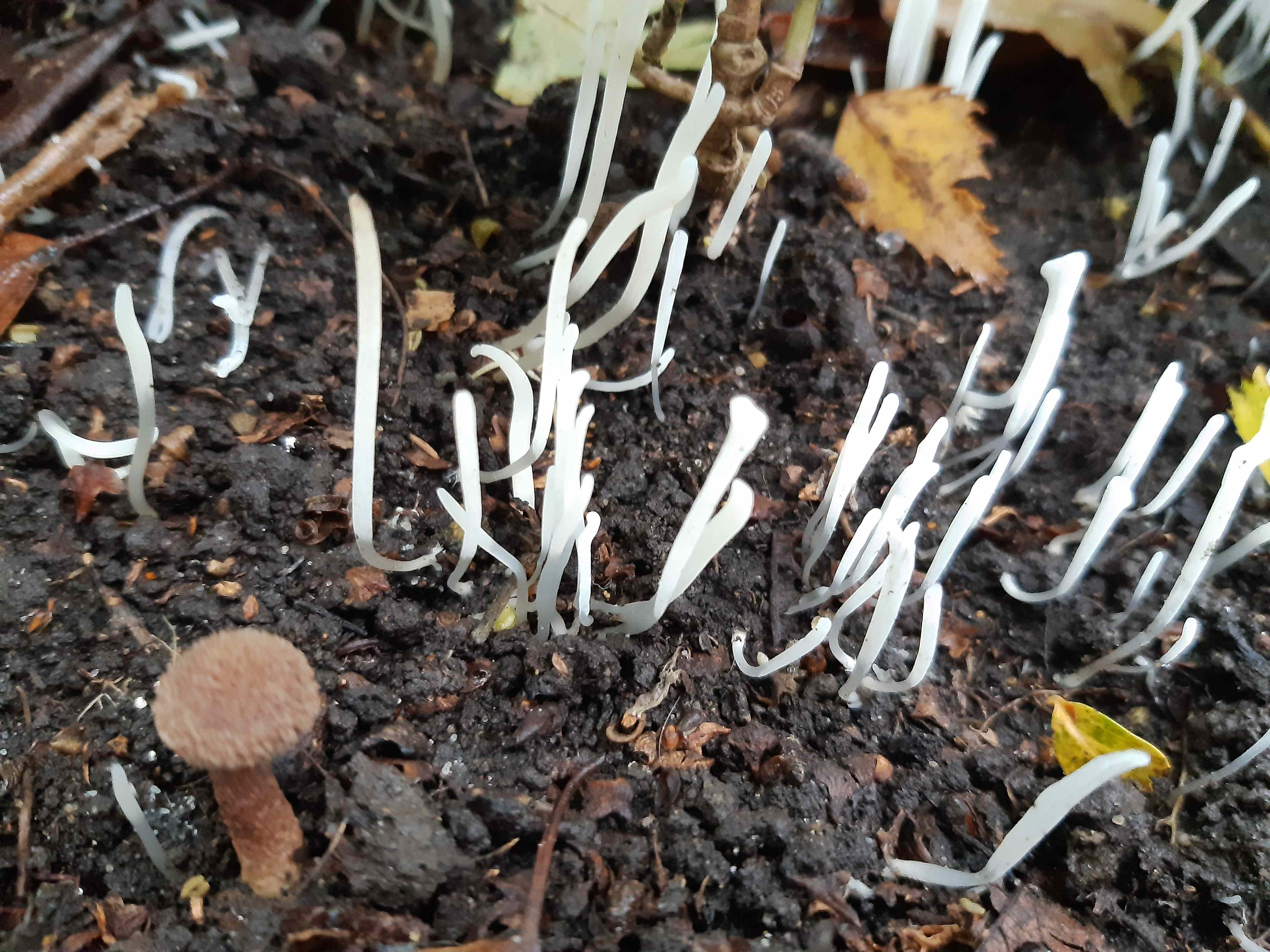
Pointed club, Clavaria acuta

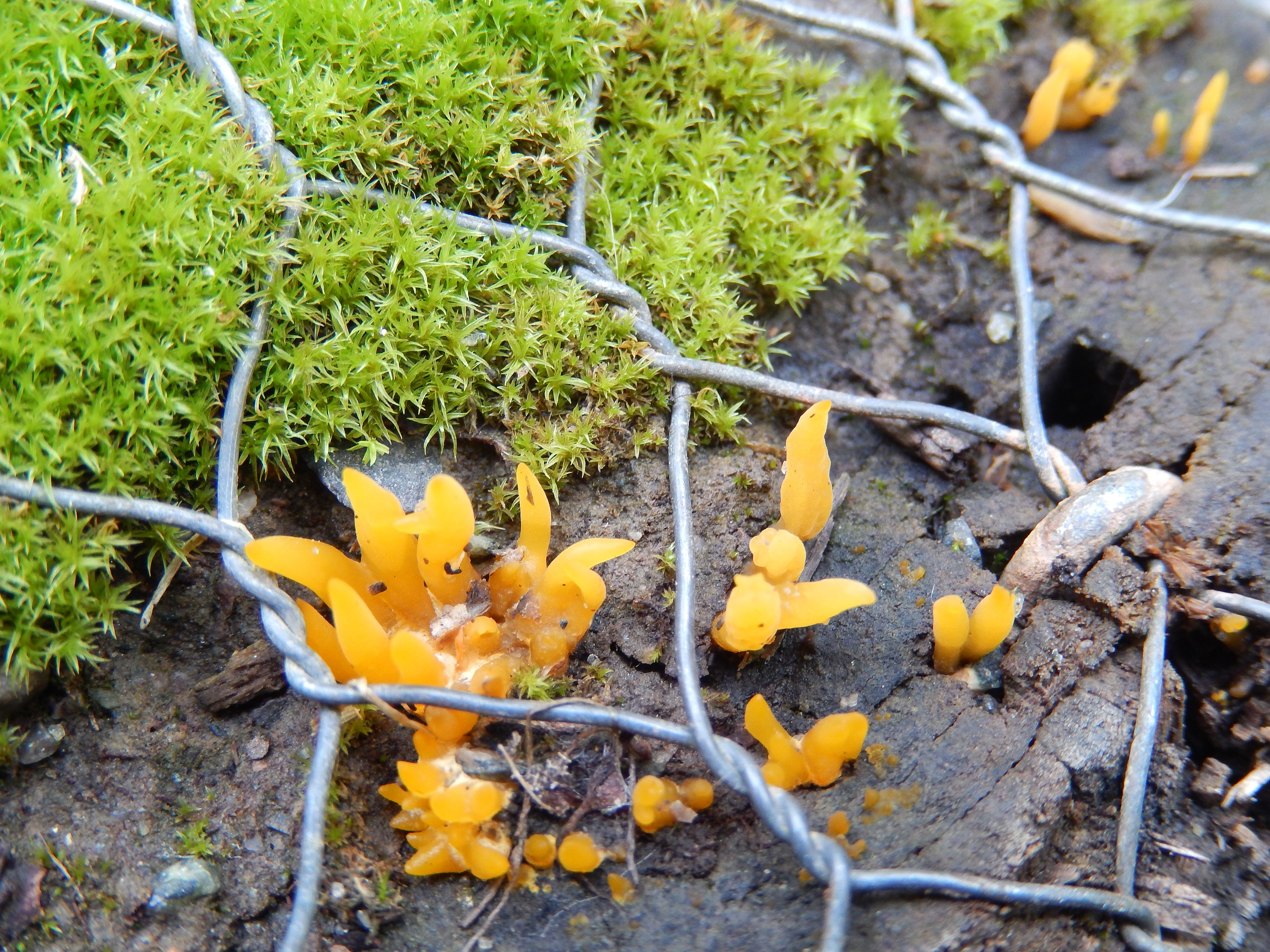
Golden spindles, Clavulinopsis fusiformis

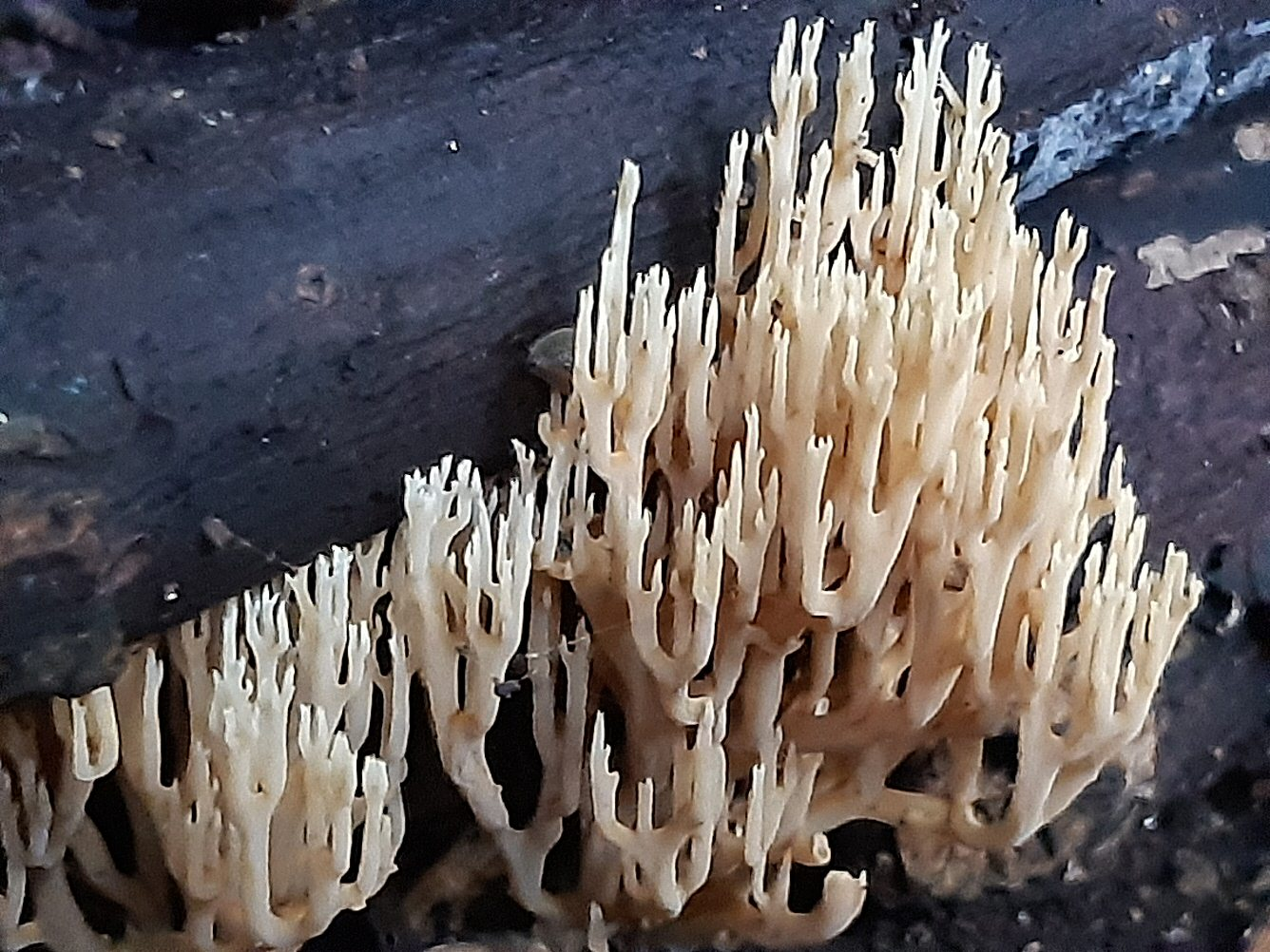
Ramaria cf stricta, a coral fungus

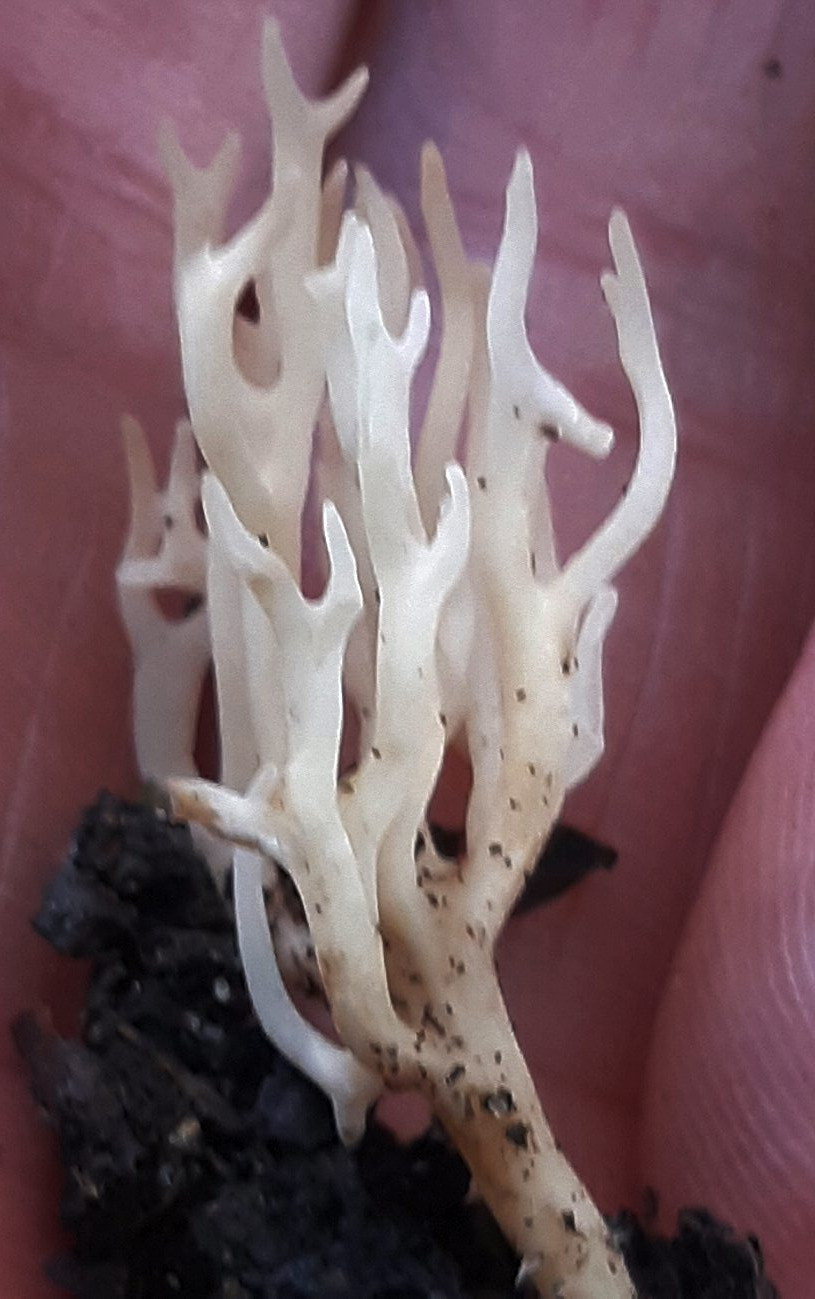
Ramariopsis subtilis, a white coral fungus
Boletes, polypores, brackets

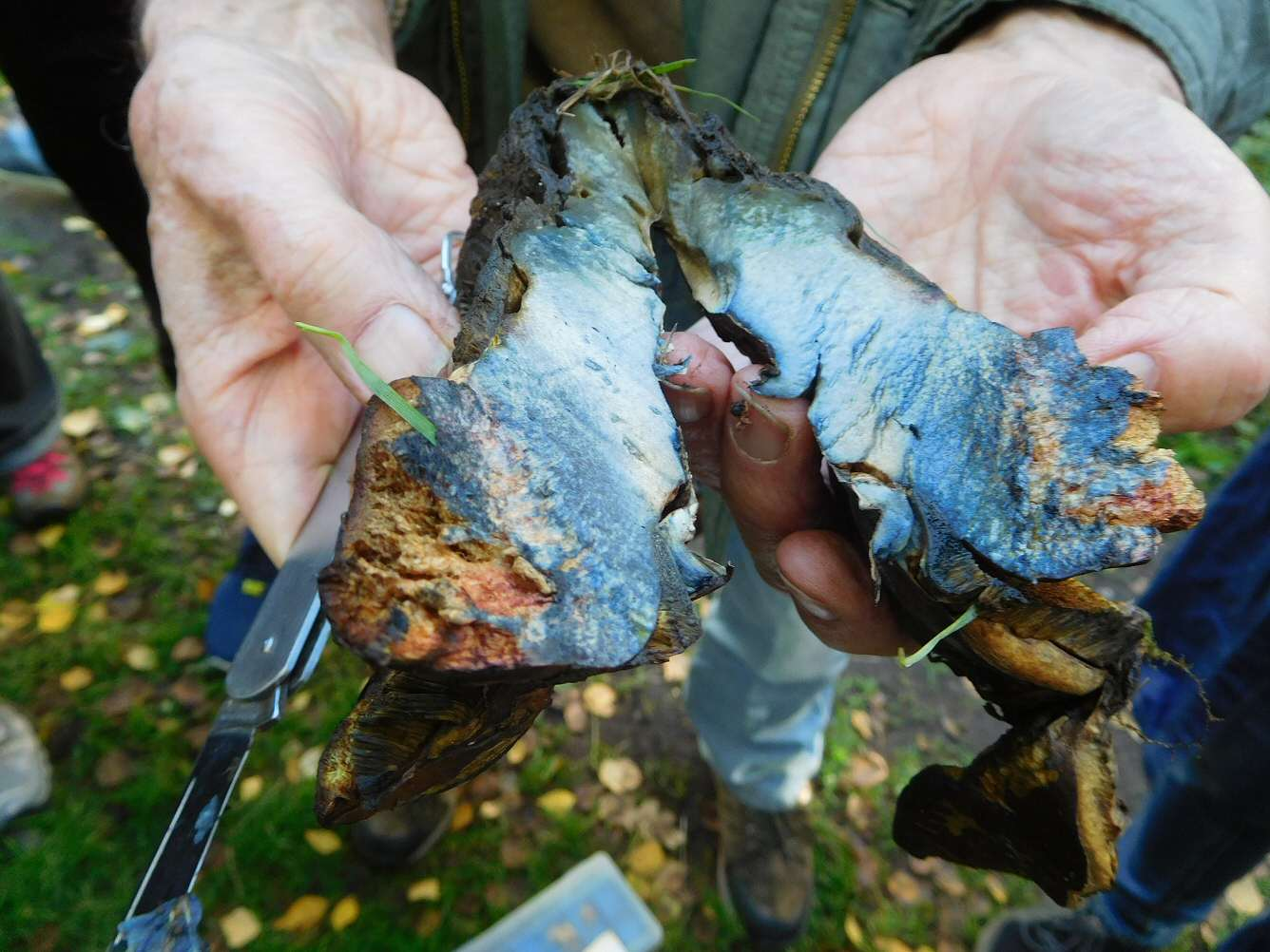
Dotted stem bolete, Neoboletus luridiformis (formerly Boletus erythropus), blue-staining when freshly cut

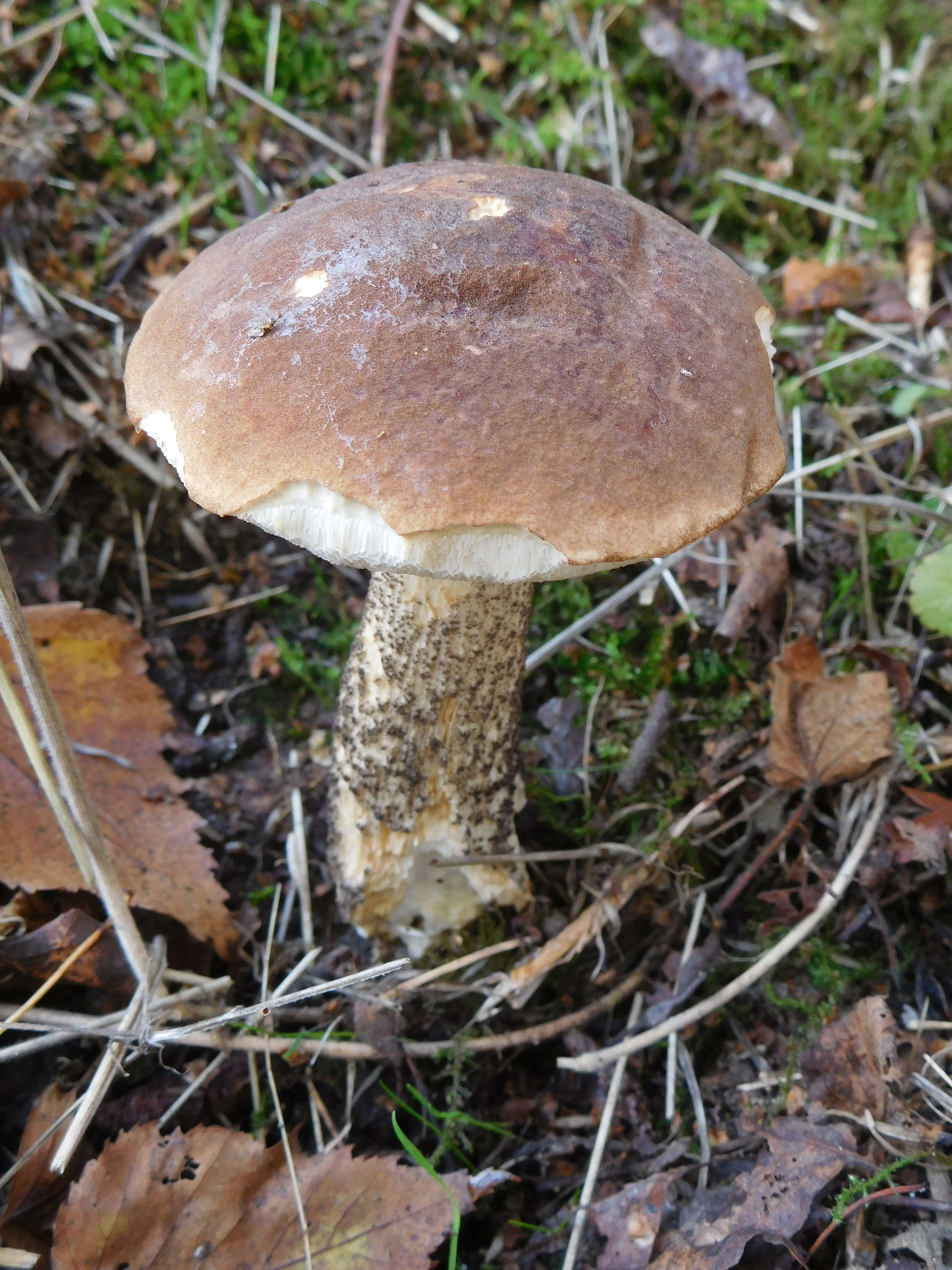
Brown birch bolete, Leccinum scabrum

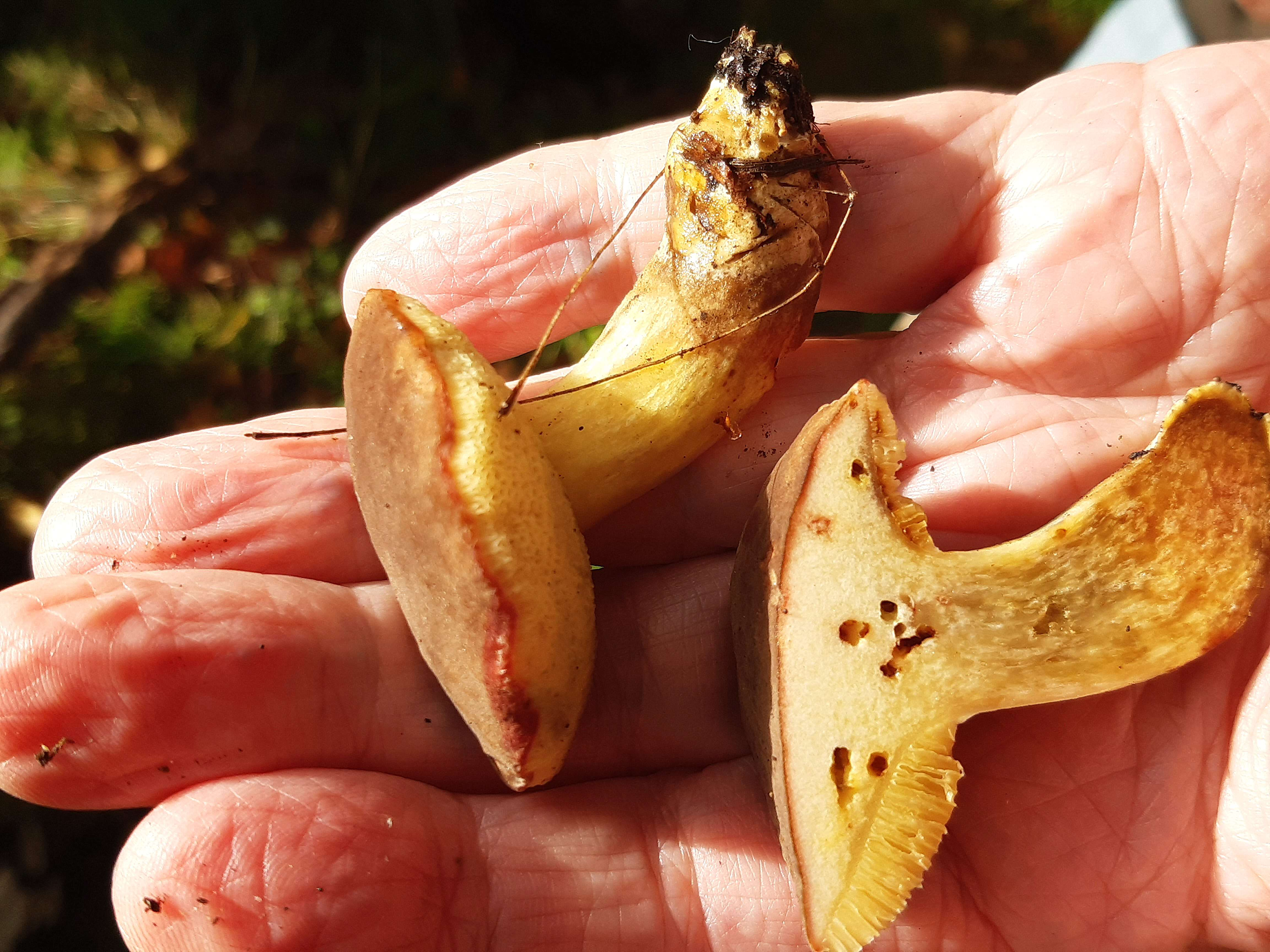
Xerocomellus, a bolete, under birch

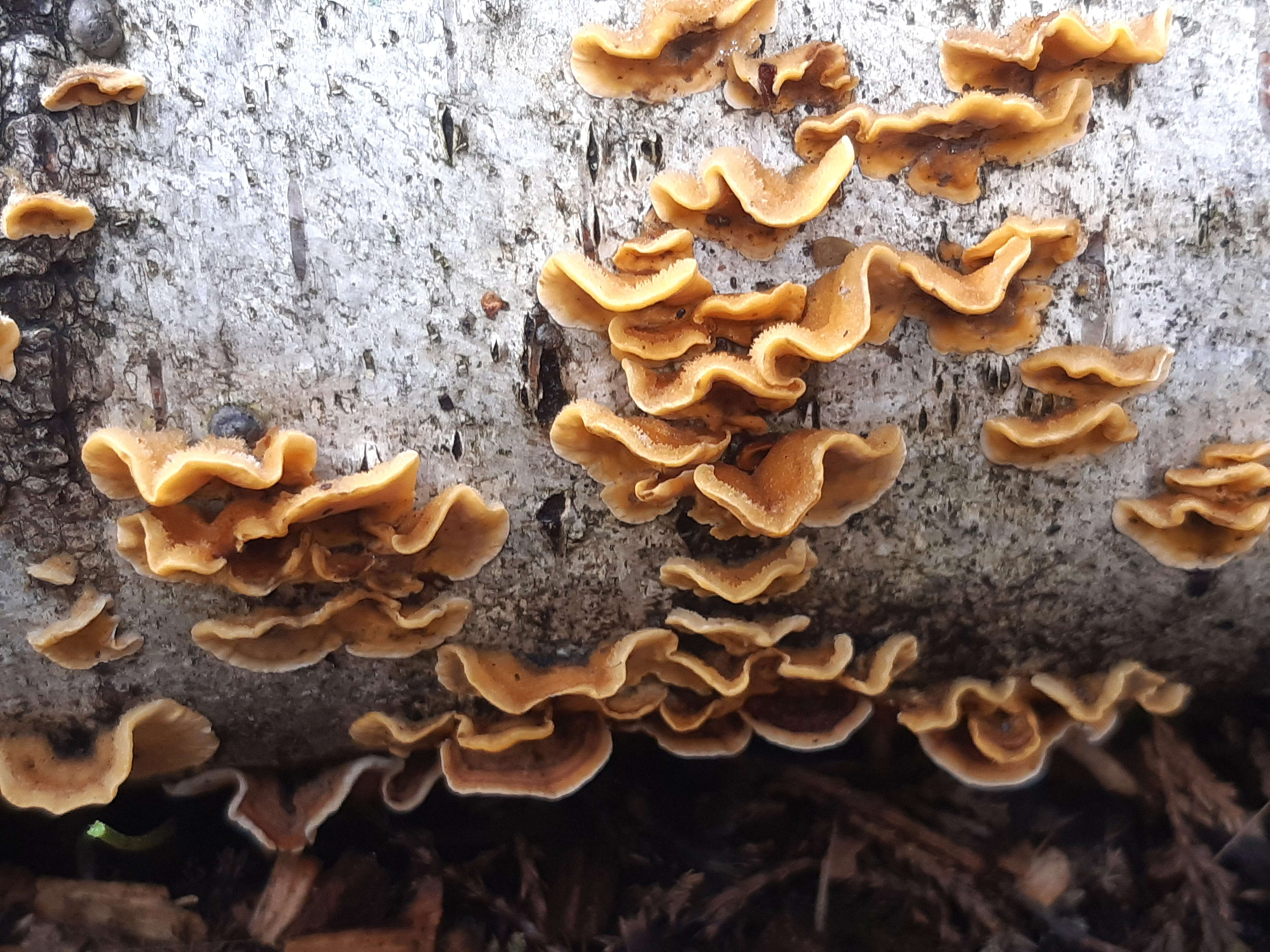
Orange curtain crust, Stereum hirsutum

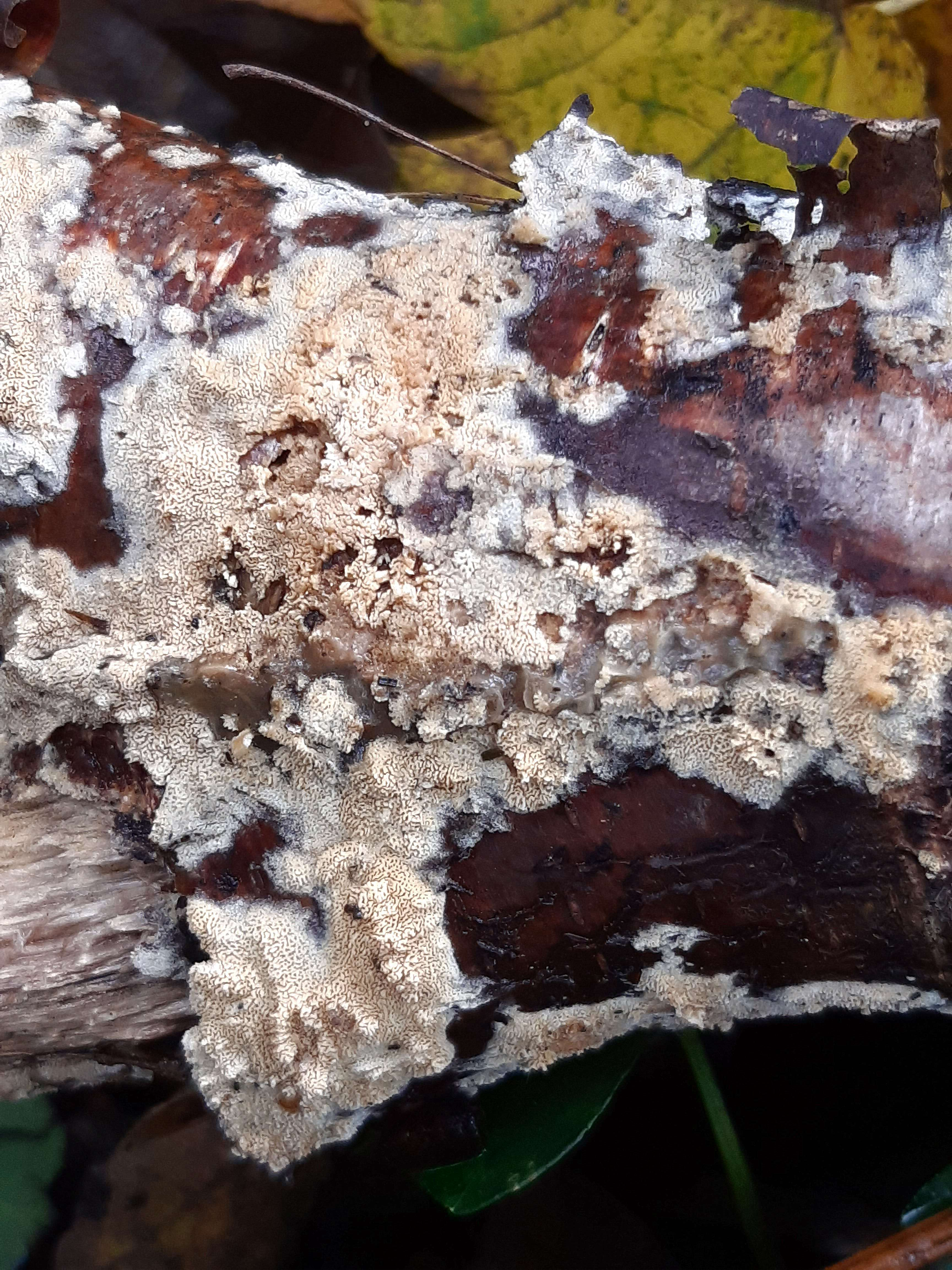
Split porecrust Schizopora paradoxa with mazy gills

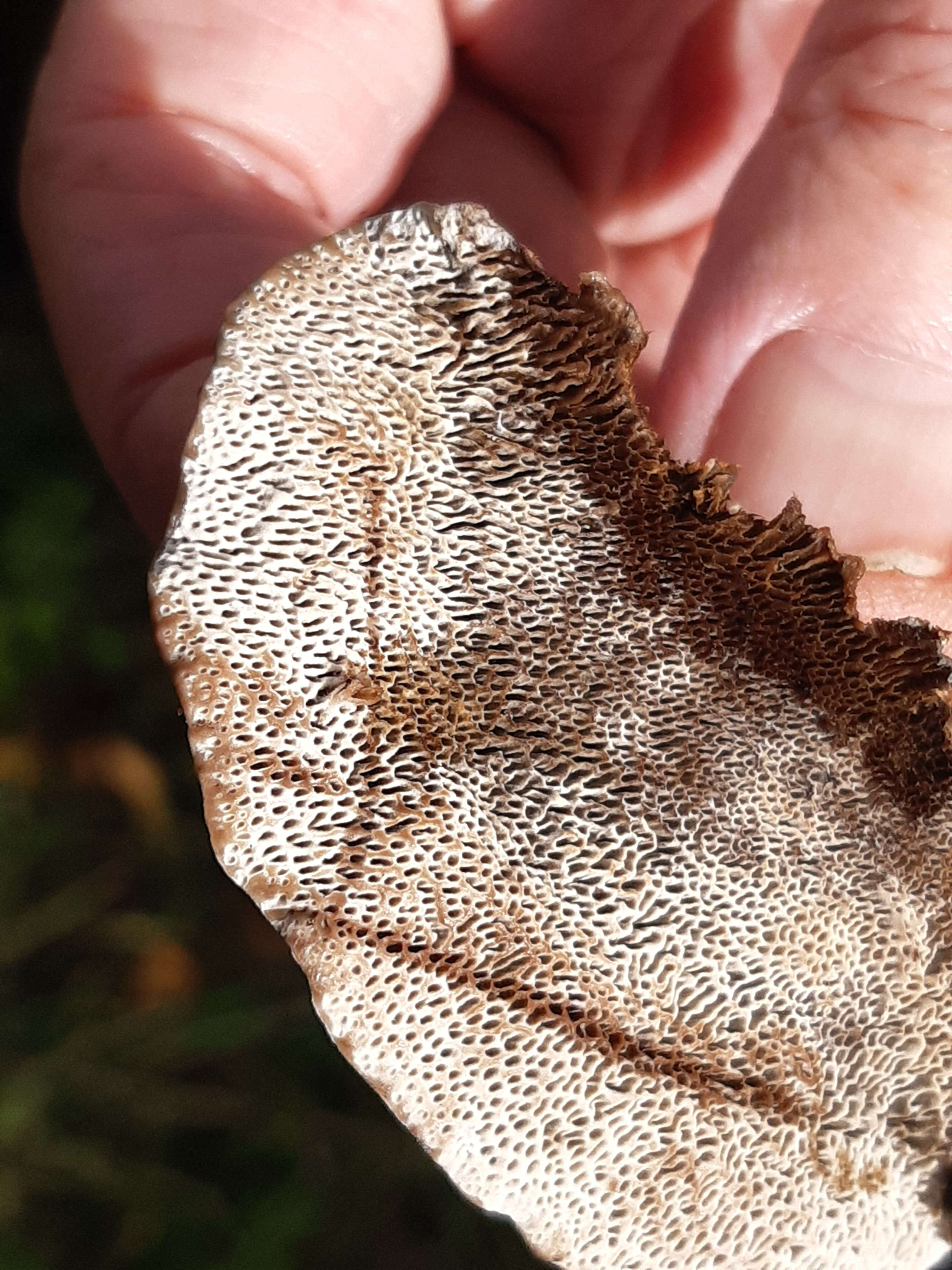
Blushing bracket, Daedaleopsis confragosa, discolouring where scratched

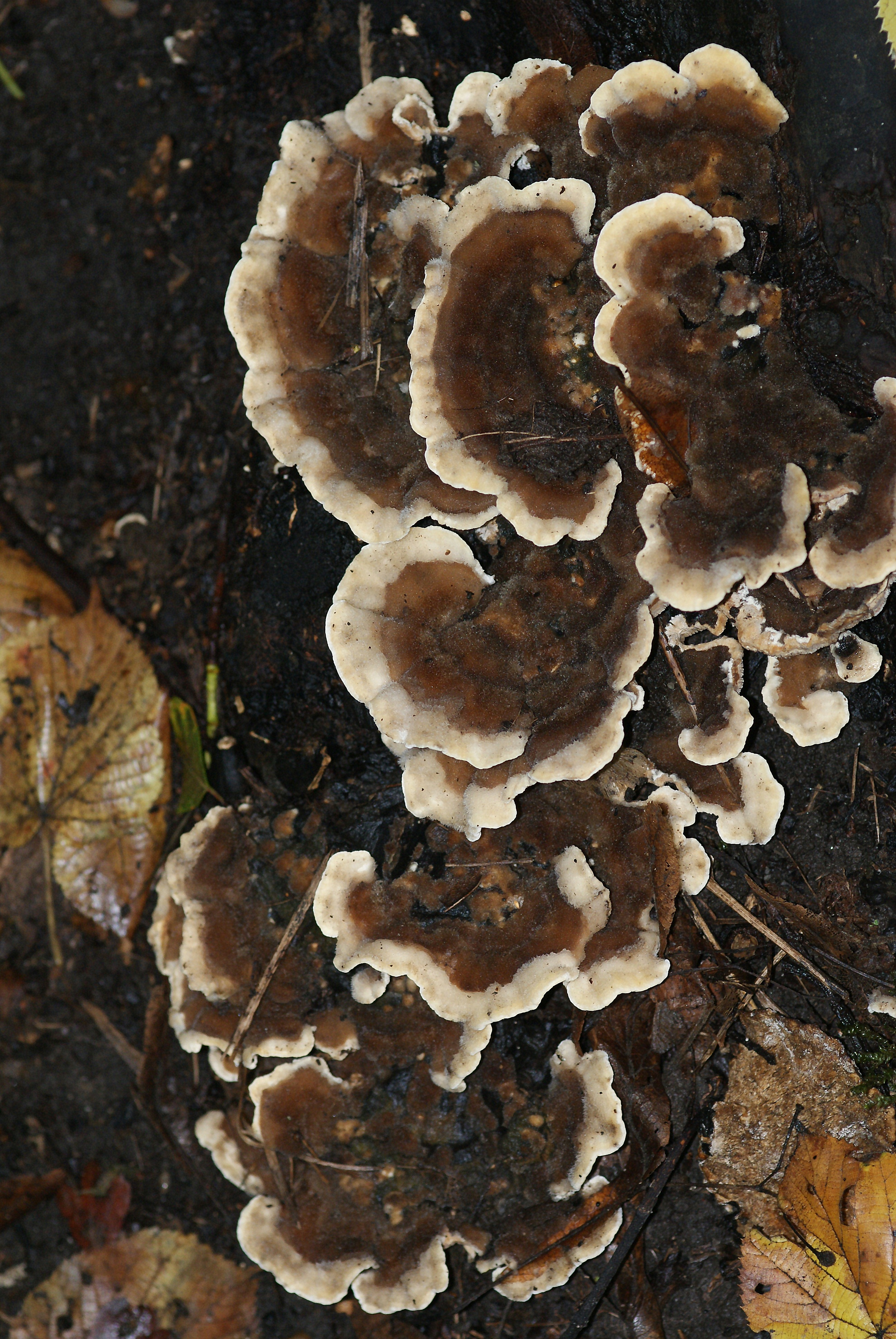
Turkeytail bracket fungus, Trametes (Coriolus) versicolor

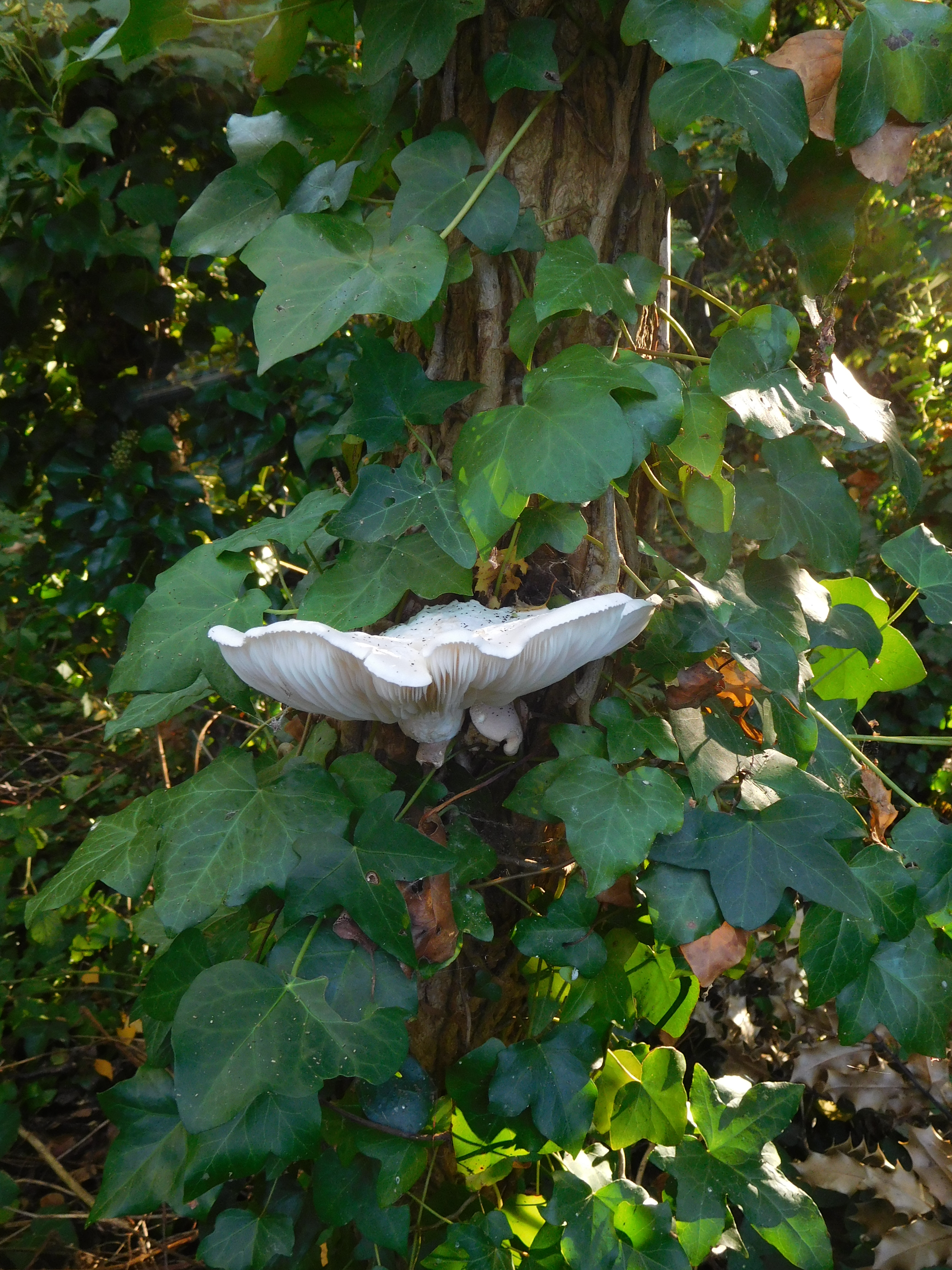
Lyophyllum ulmarium on ivy-clad elder

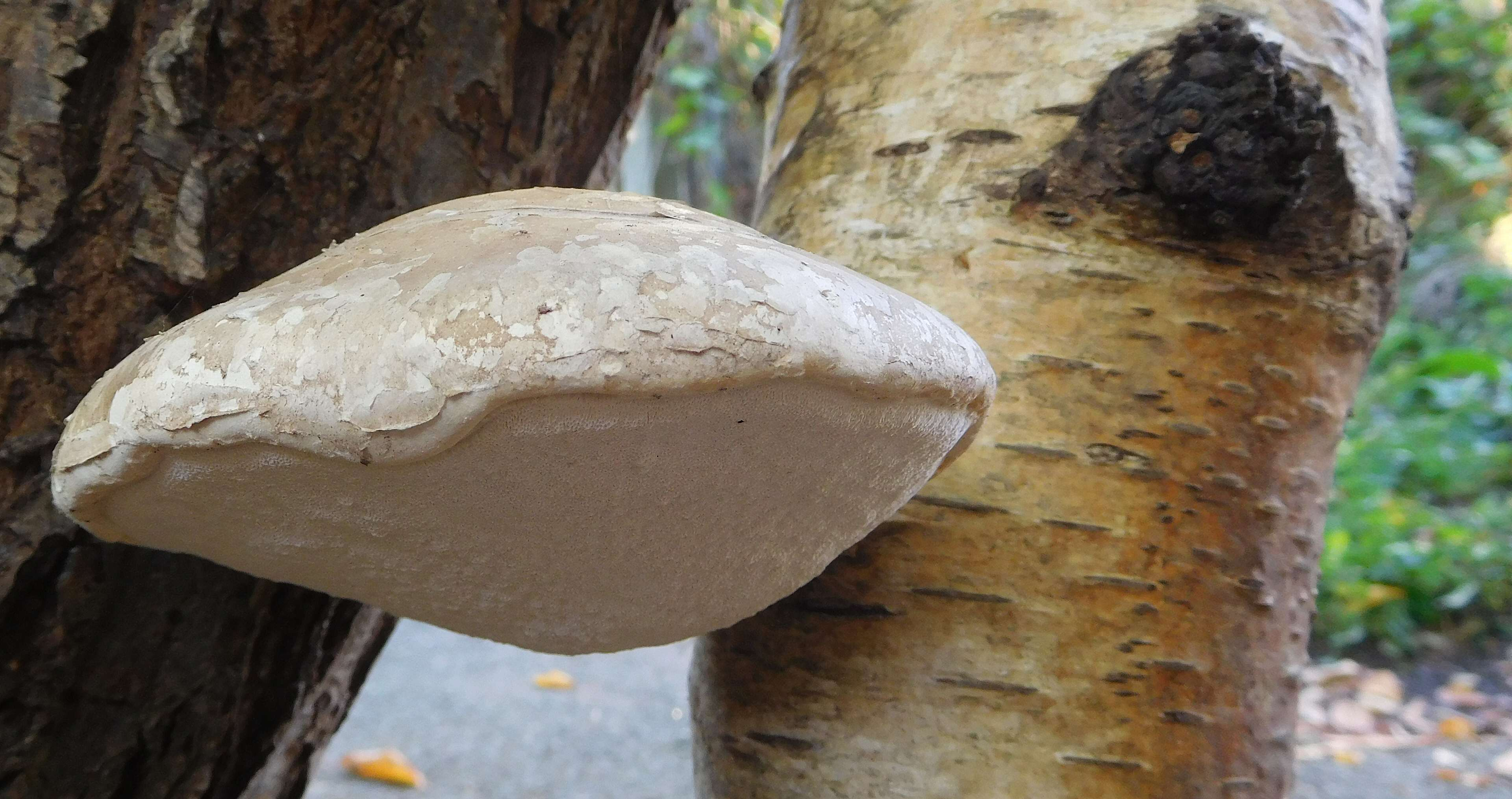
Birch Polypore, Fomitopsis betulina, on birch log

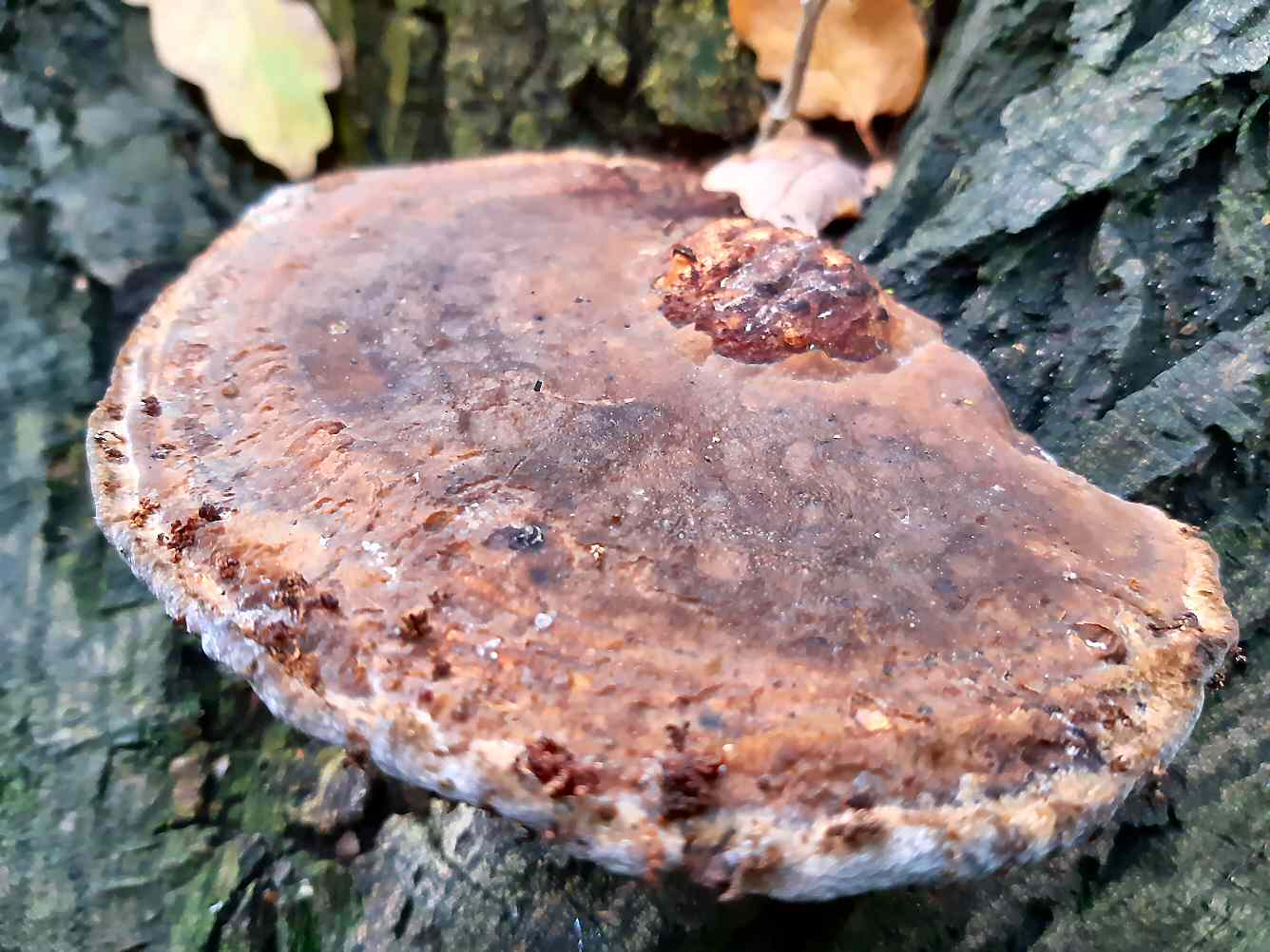
Blushing bracket, Daedaleopsis confragosa

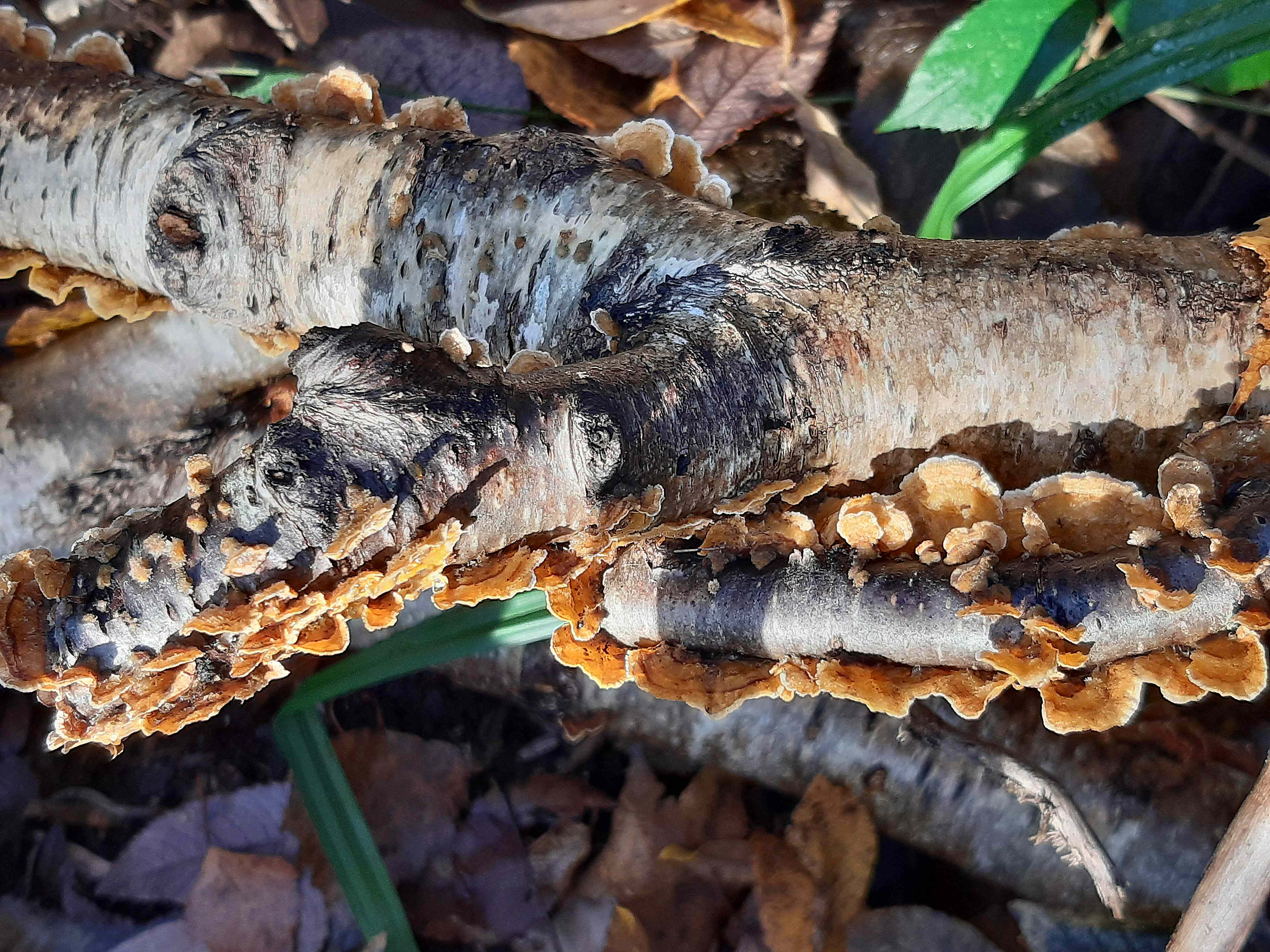
Hairy bracket, Trametes hirsuta, on birch log

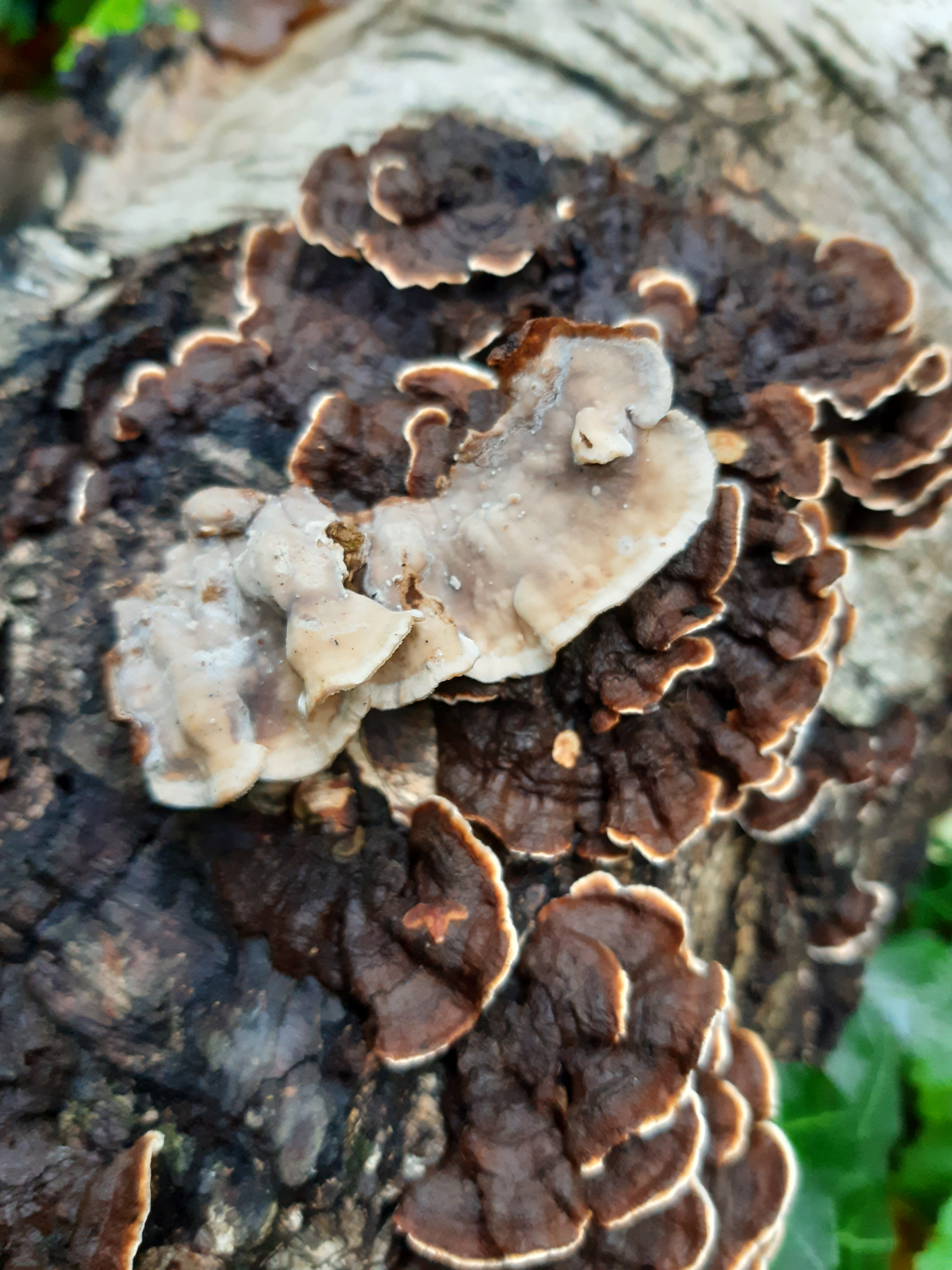
Laxitextum bicolor, a new species for the reserve

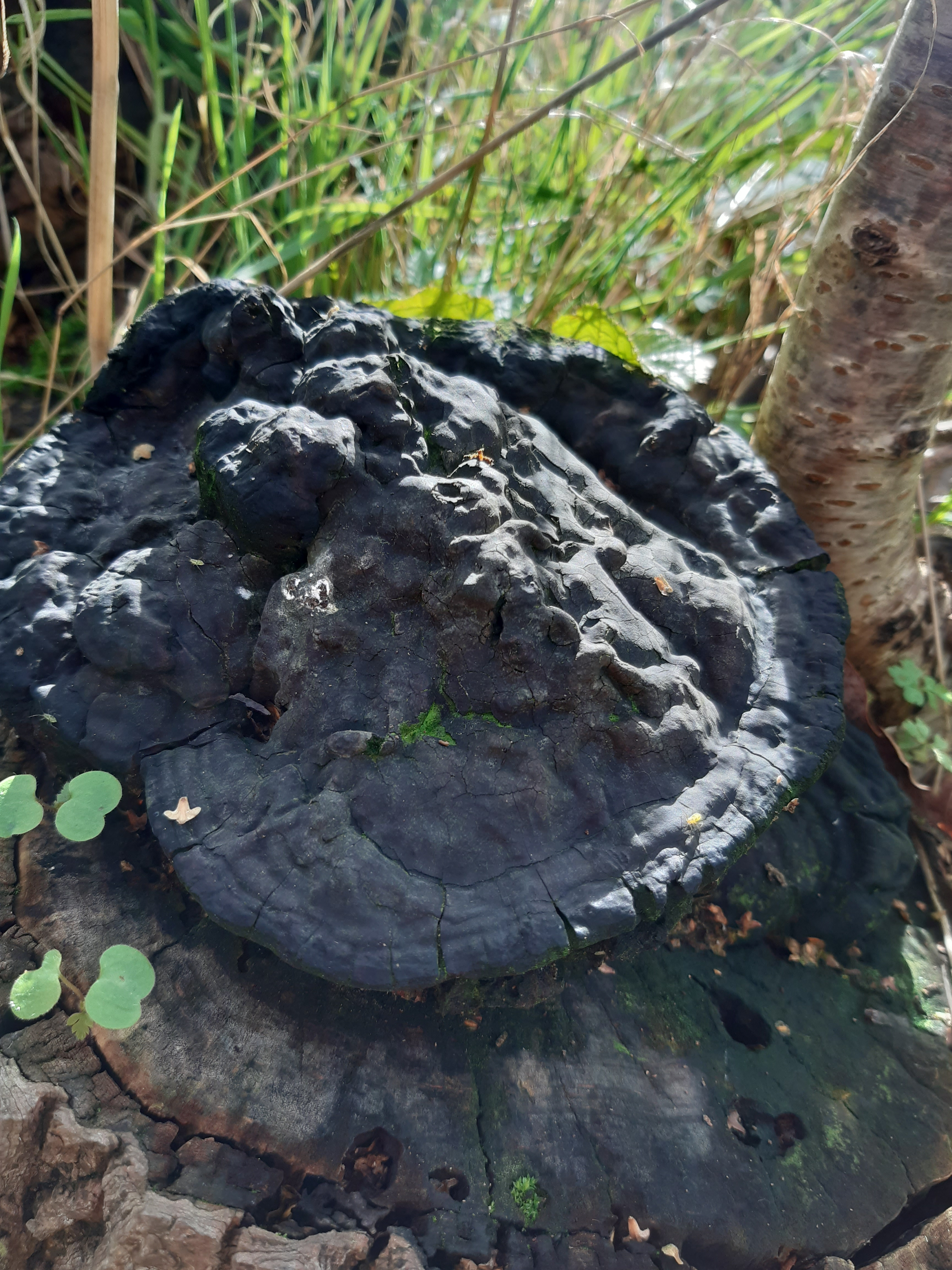
Ganoderma adspersum, Southern bracket, on willow stump

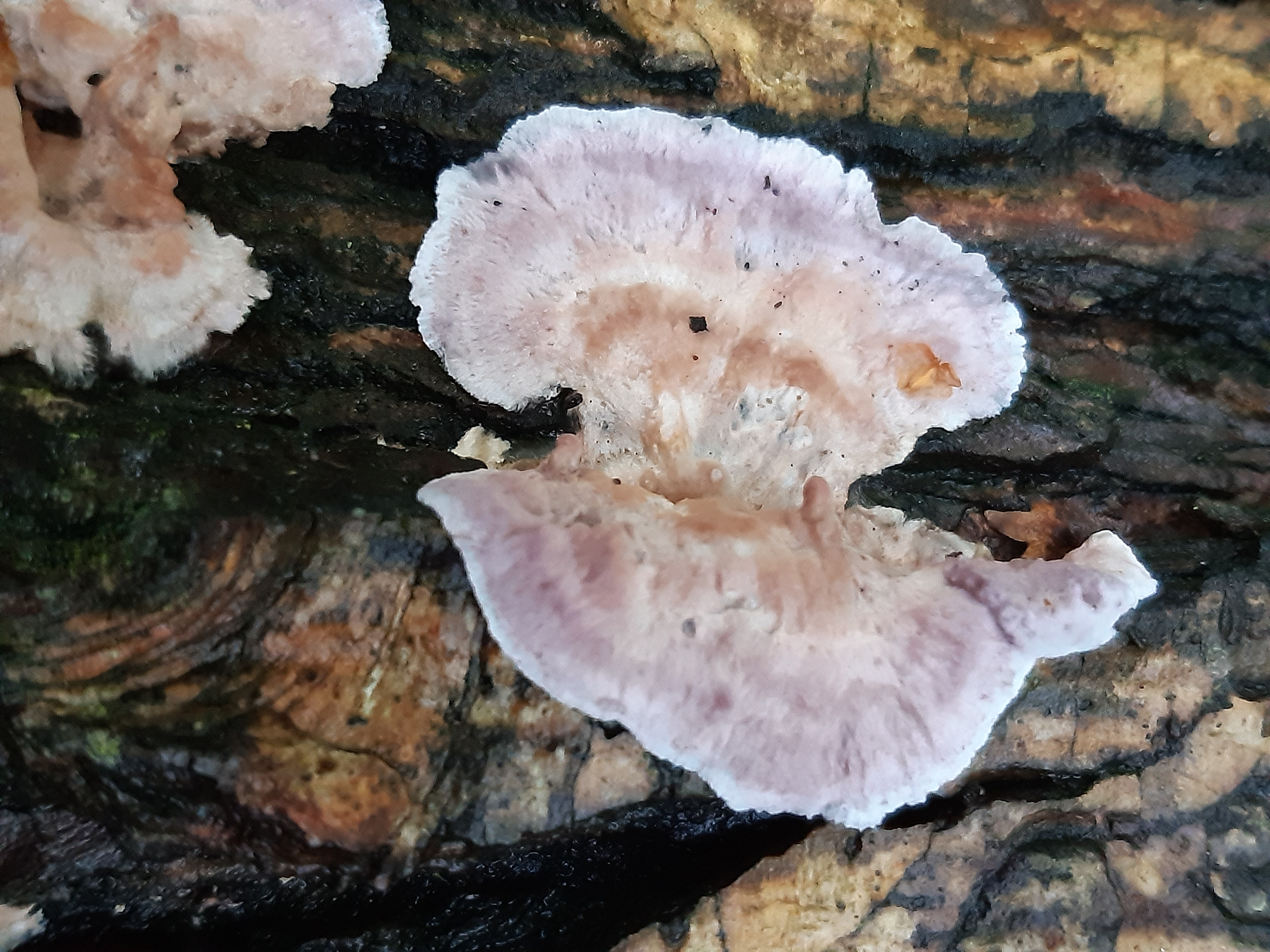
Silverleaf fungus Chondrostereum purpureum

Ascomycetes
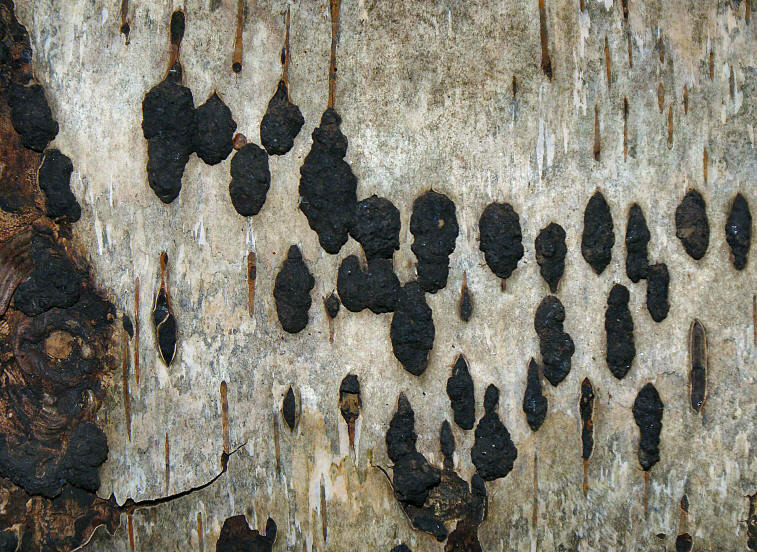
Birch woodwart Hypoxylon multiforme

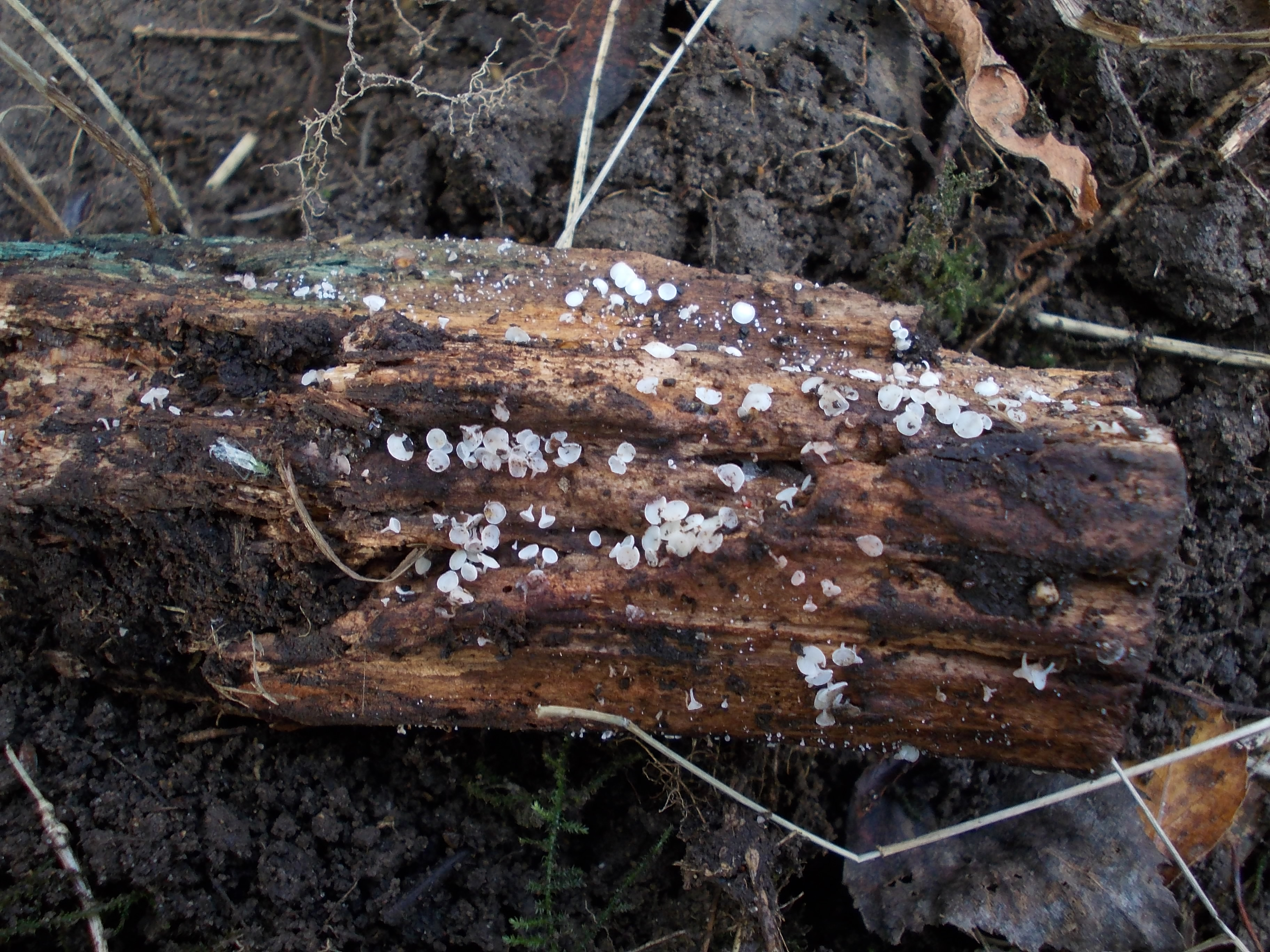
Oak pin, Cudoniella acicularis

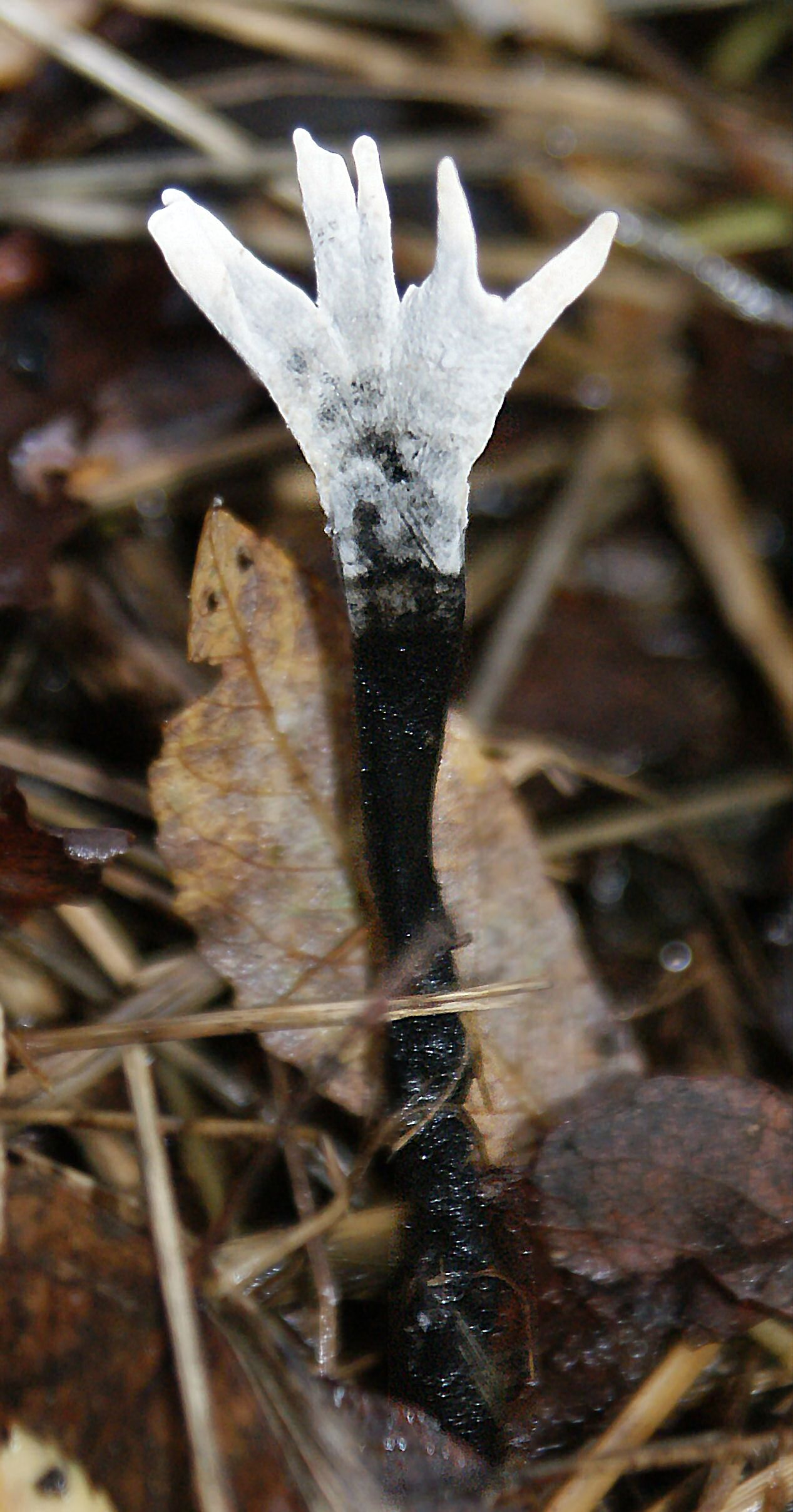
Candlesnuff or stag's horn fungus, Xylaria hypoxylon

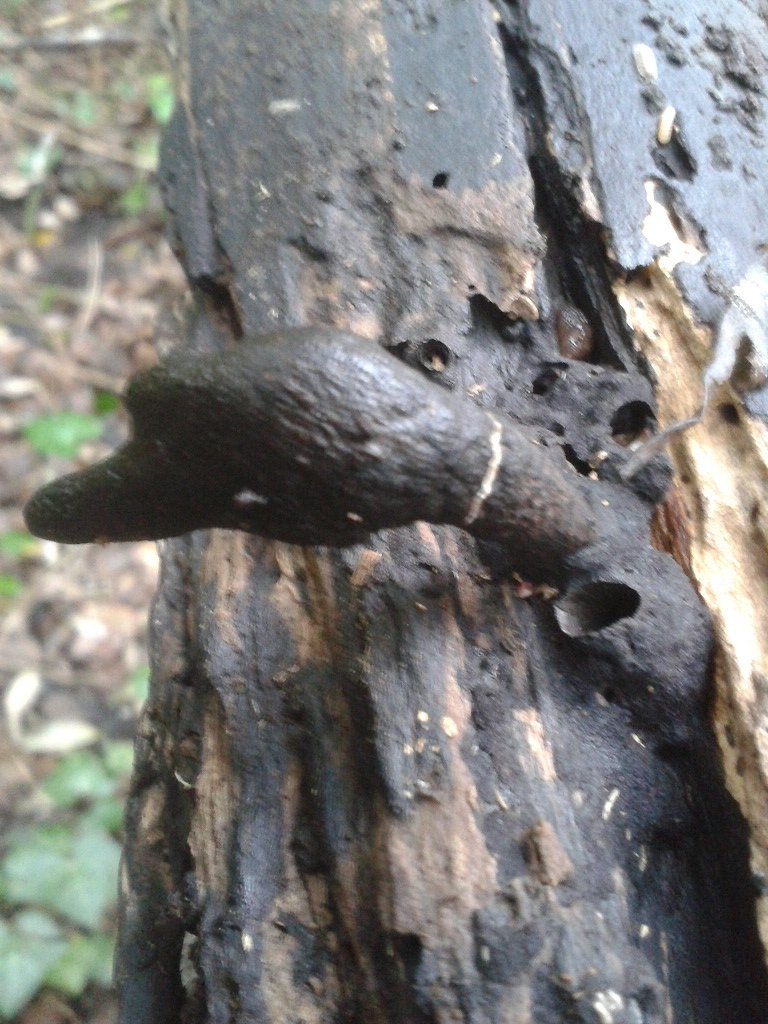
Dead man's fingers, Xylaria polymorpha

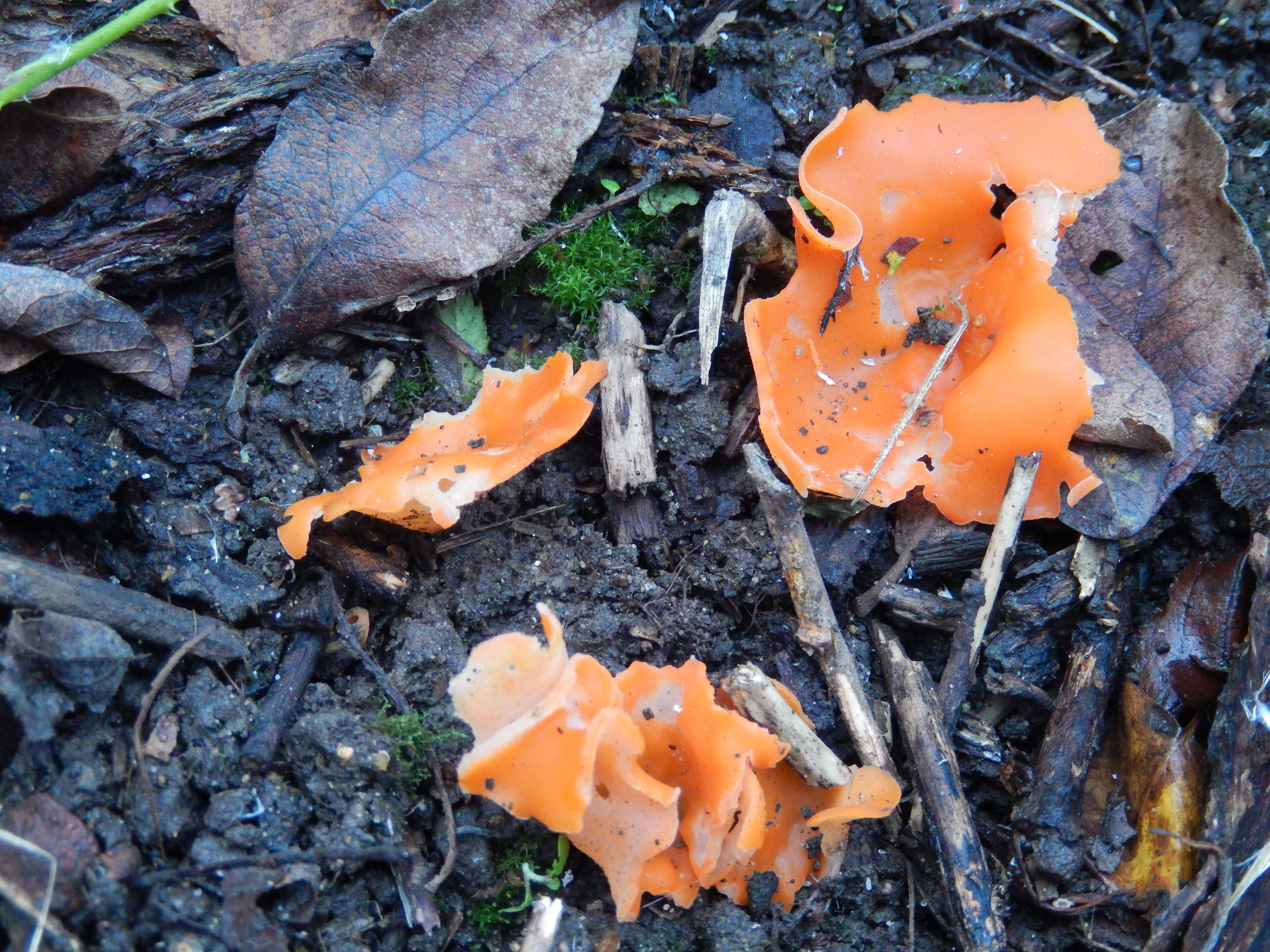
Orange peel fungus, Aleuria aurantia

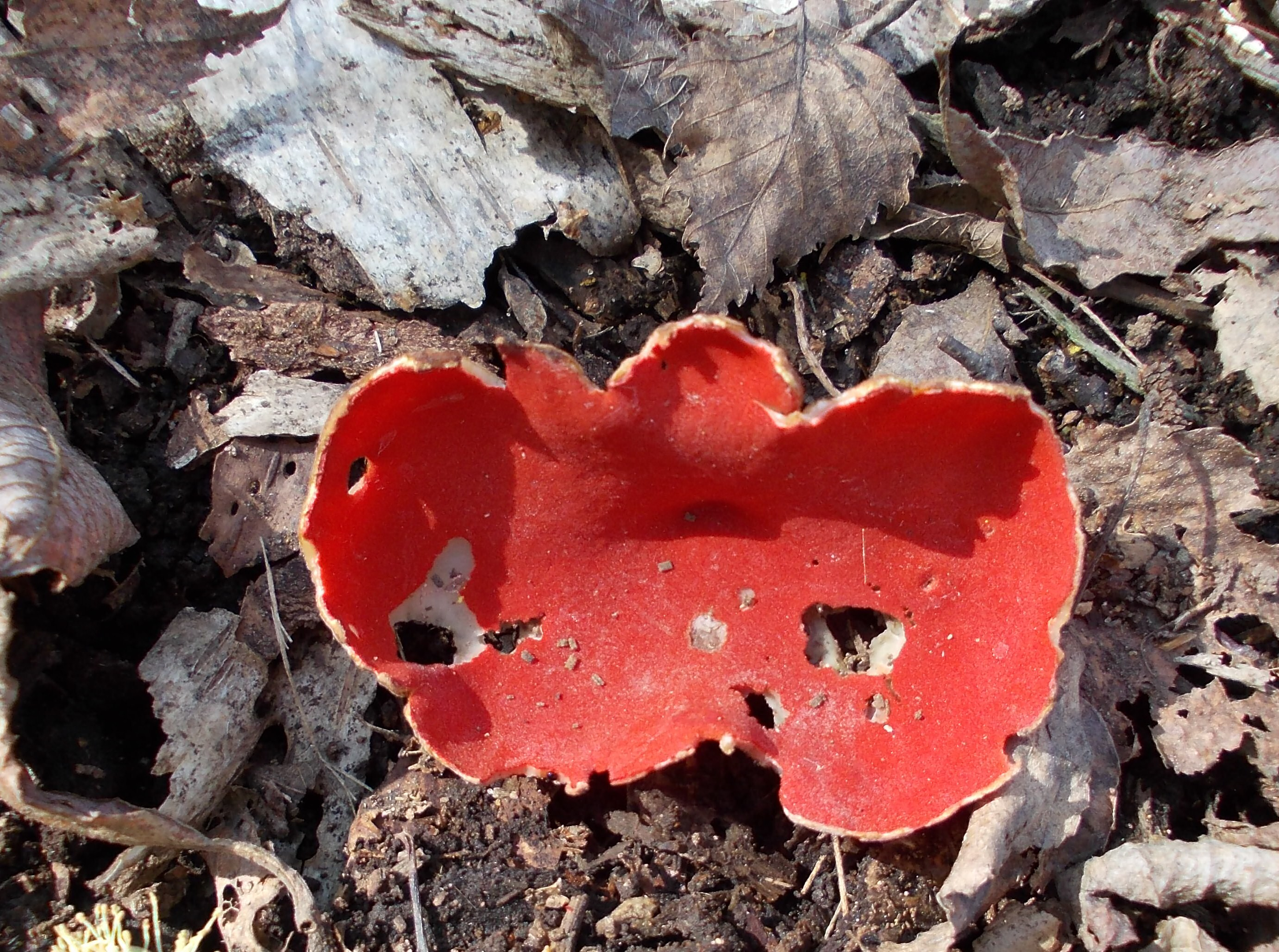
Scarlet elf cup fungus, Sarcoscypha austriaca

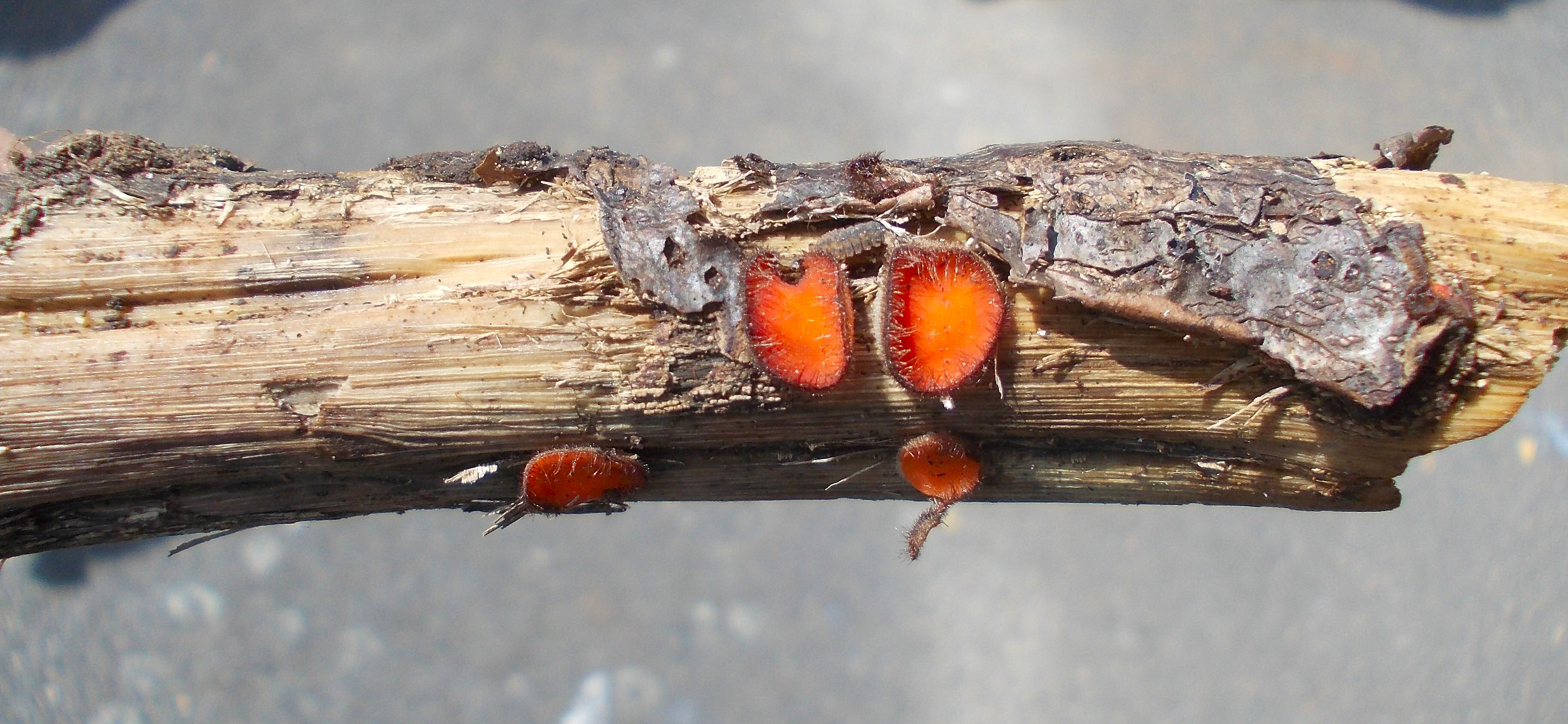
Eyelash fungus, Scutellinia scutellata

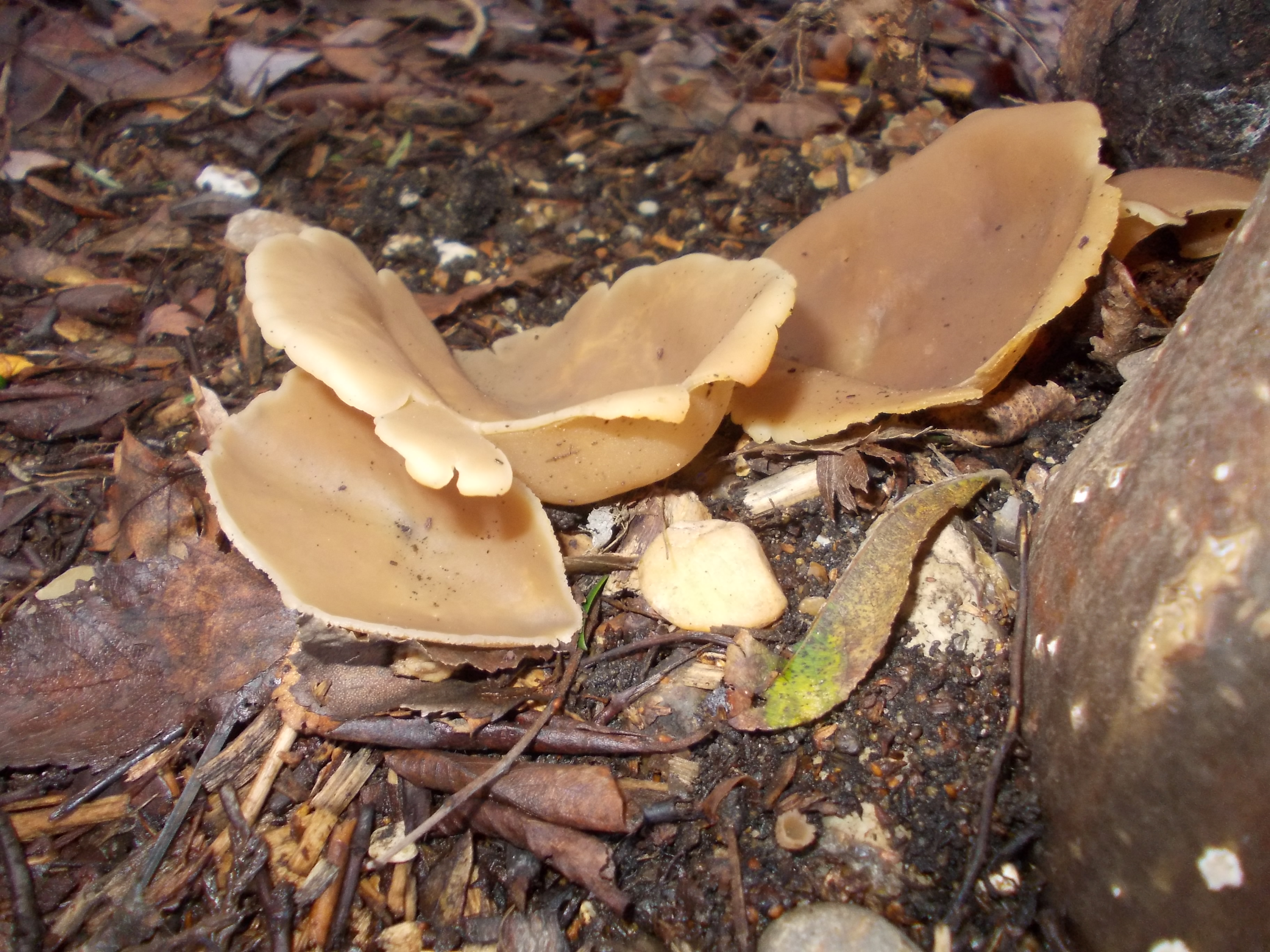
Layered cup, Peziza varia

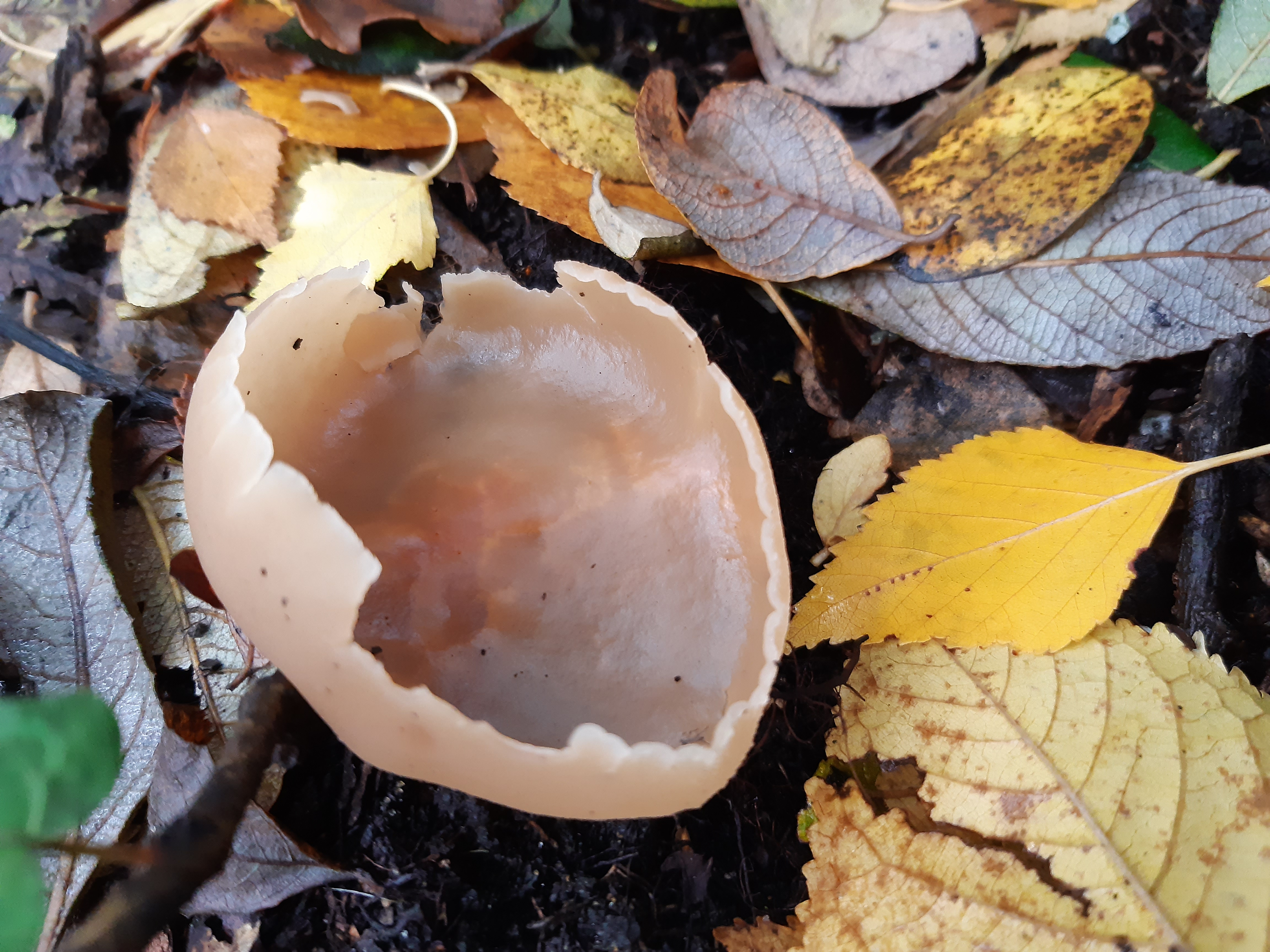
Charcoal cup, Peziza cf. echinospora

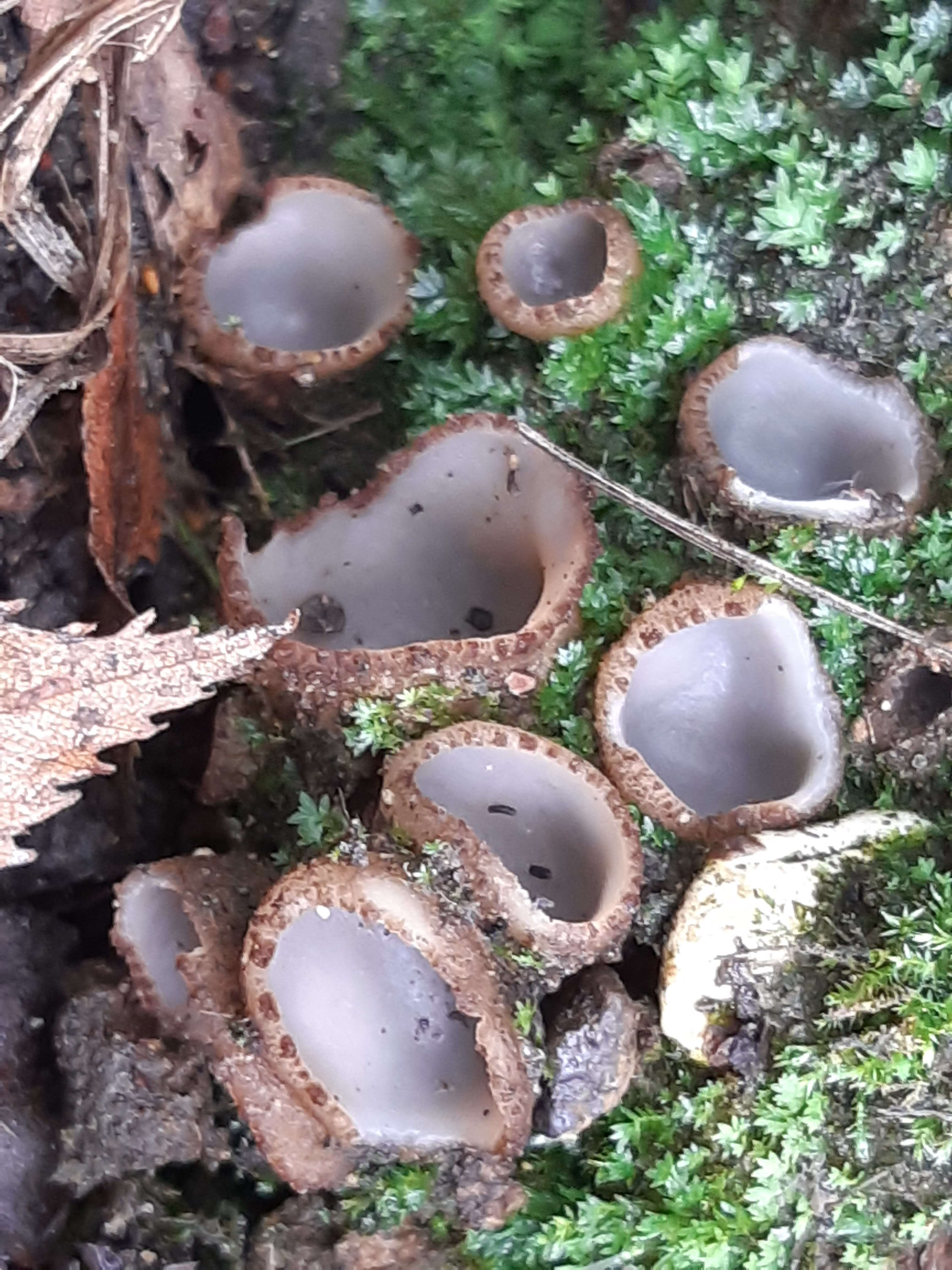
Humaria hemisphaerica - glazed cup fungus

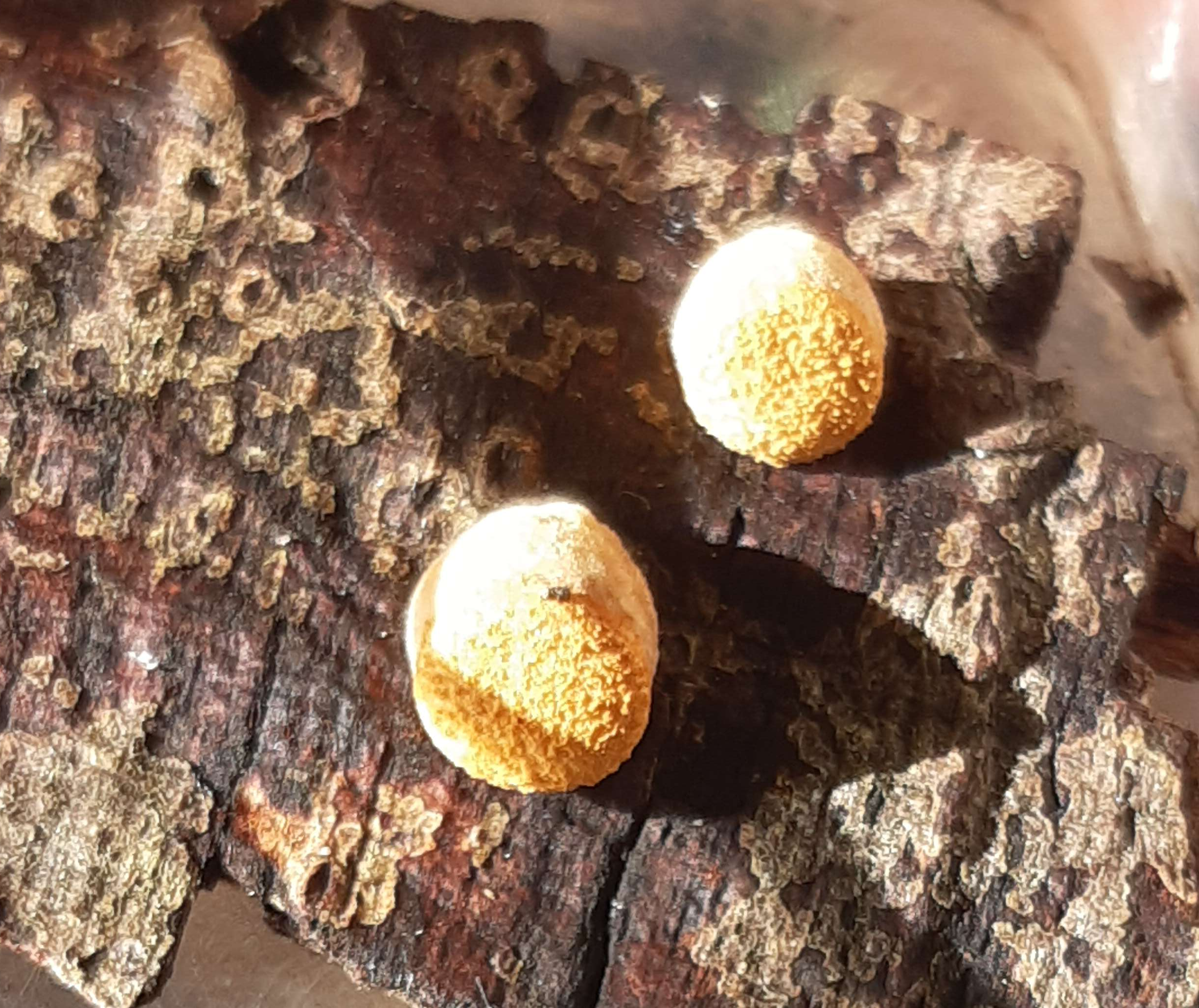
Young Crucibulum laeve birdsnest fungus

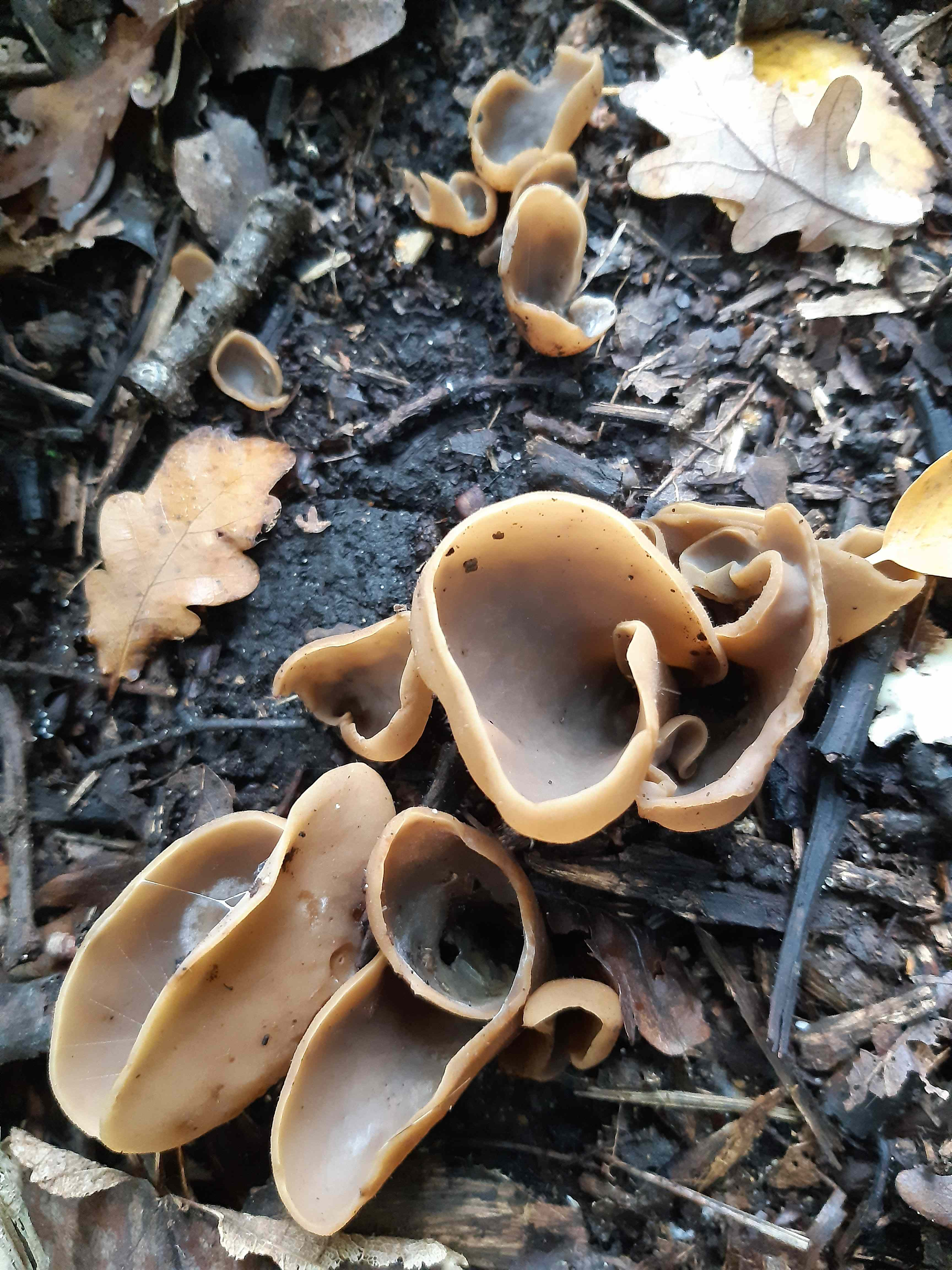
Tan ear, Otidea alutacea

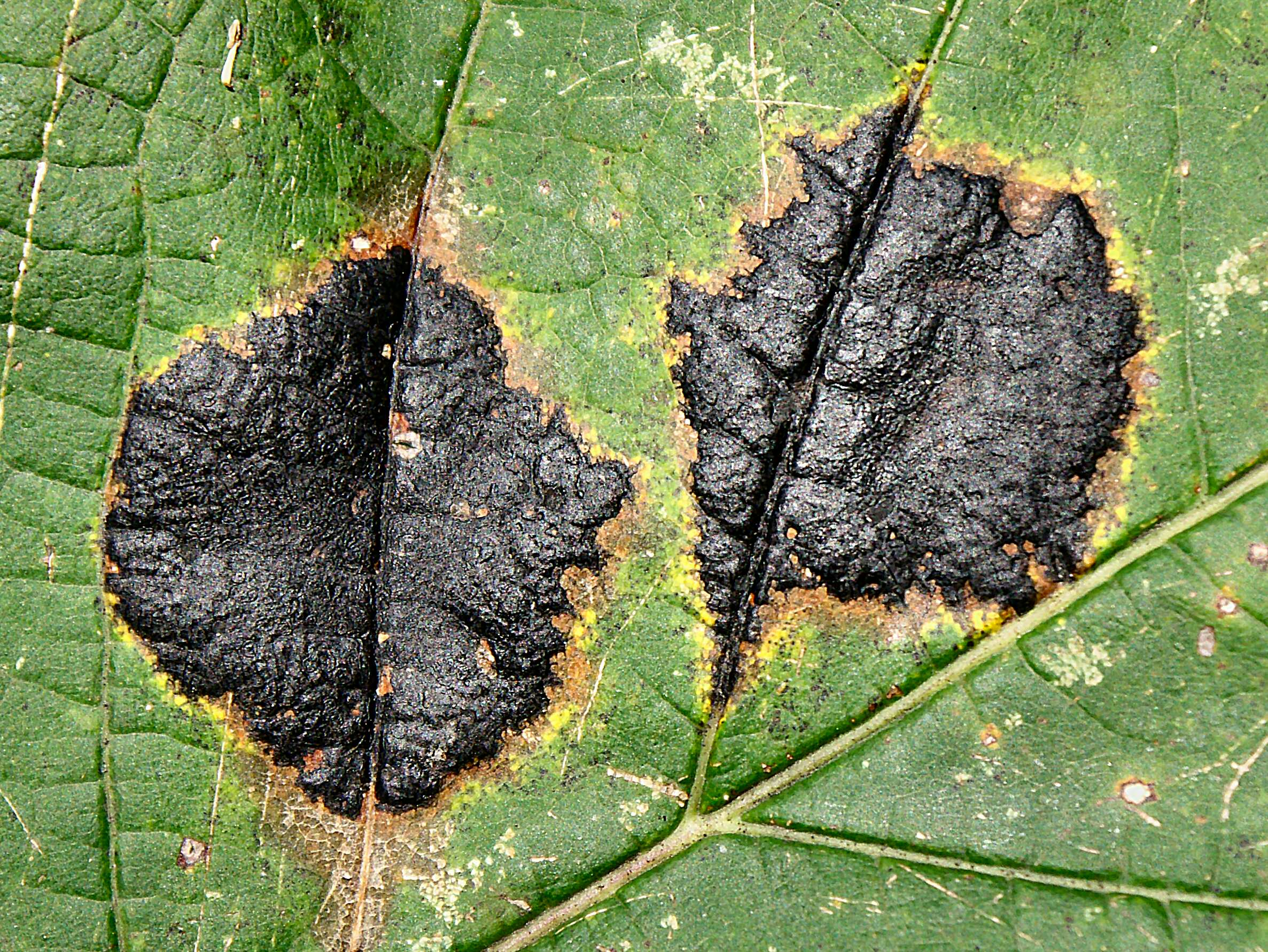
Tar-Spot fungus, Rhytisma acerinum on sycamore leaf

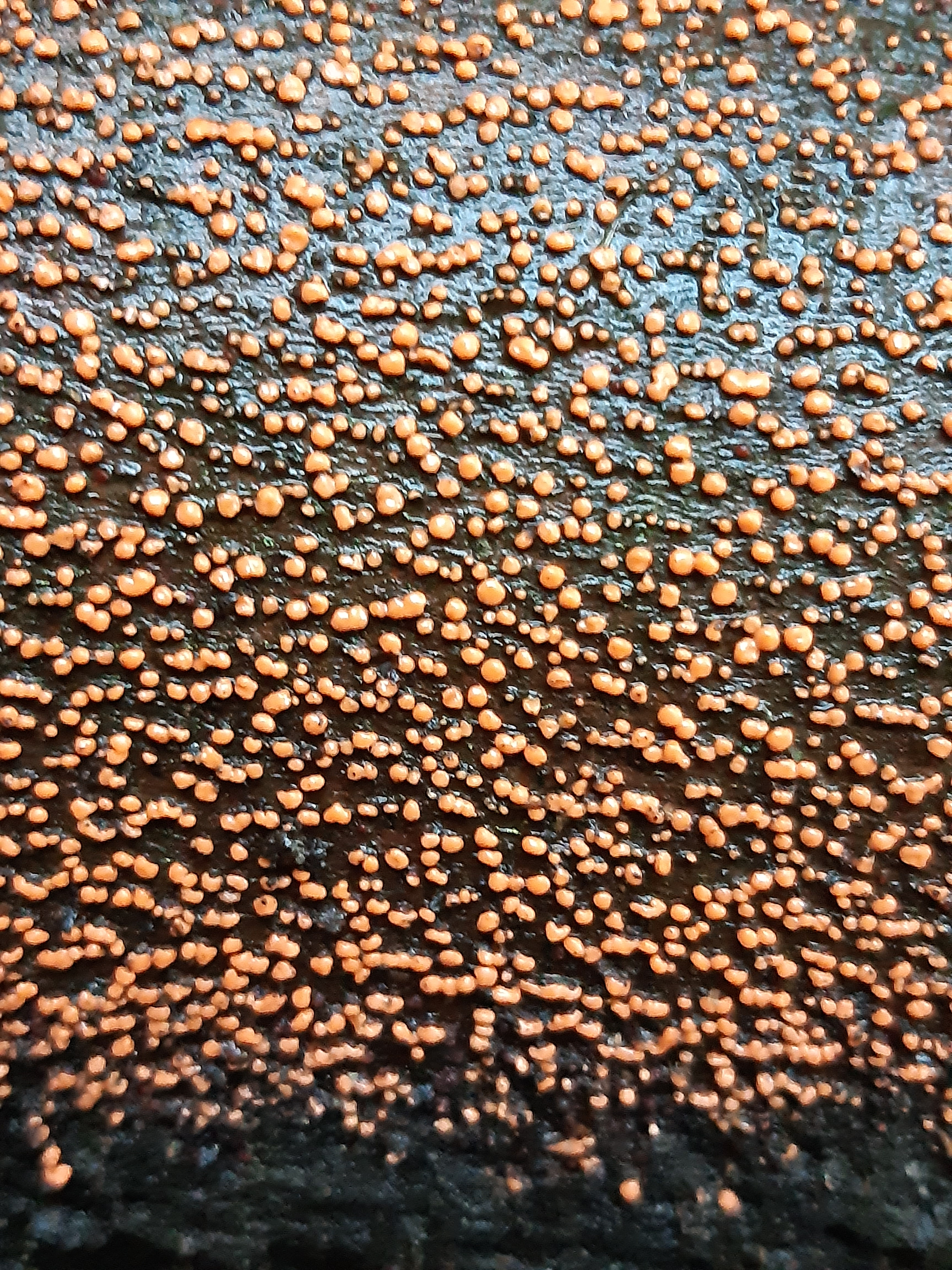
Coral Spot fungus Nectria cinnabarina

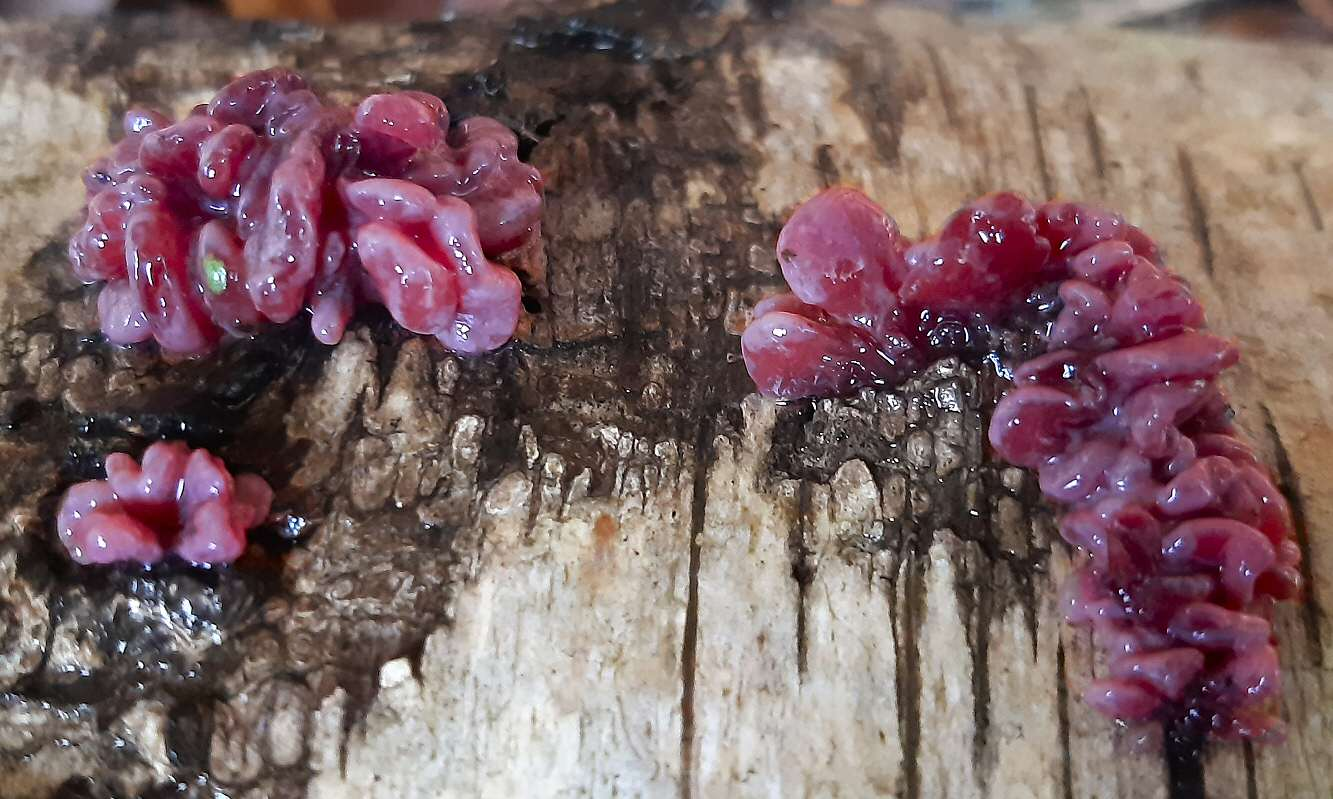
Purple jellydisc fungus, Ascocoryne sarcoides on birch log

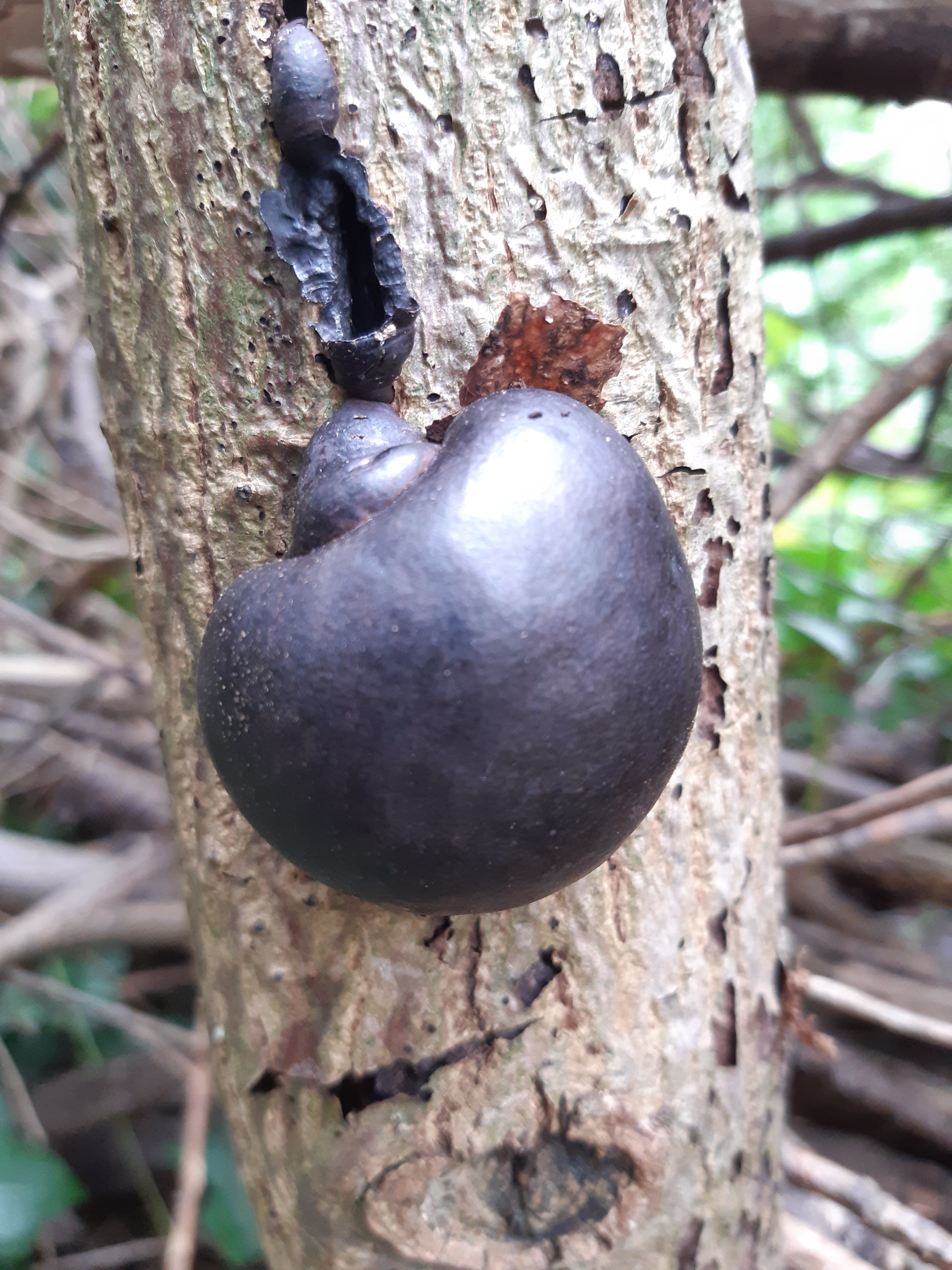
Cramp balls, Daldinia concentrica, on dead wood

Slime moulds
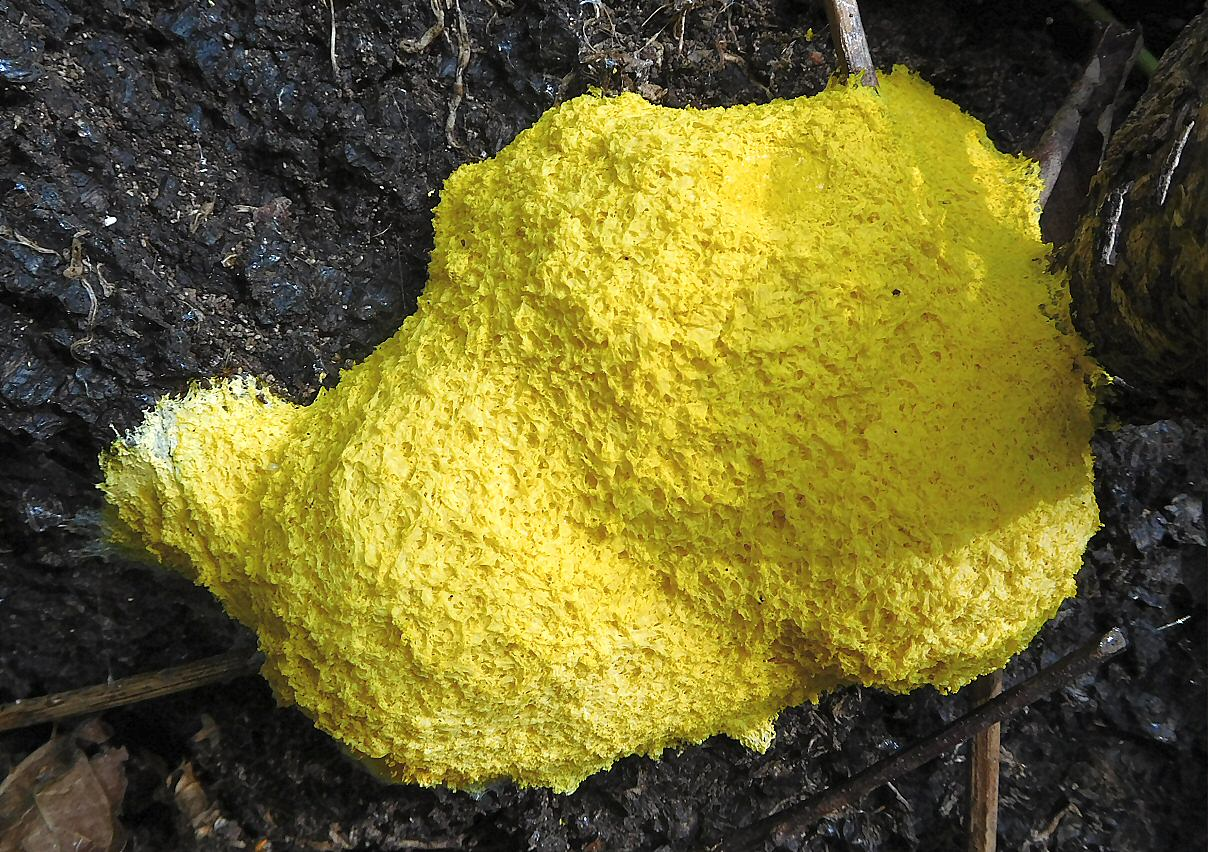
Scrambled egg slime mould, Fuligo septica

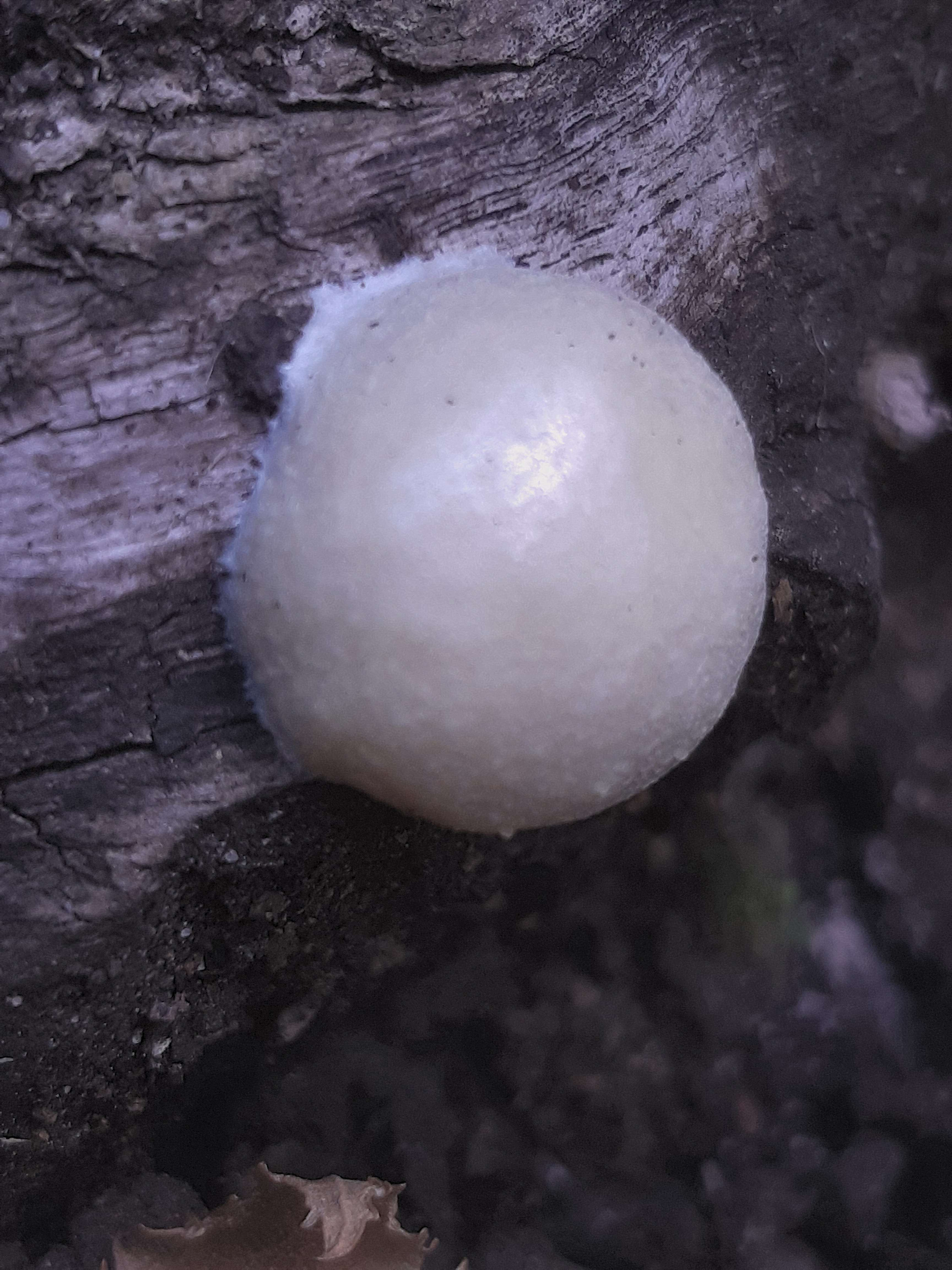
False puffball, Enteridium lycoperdon, a large rubbery slime mould

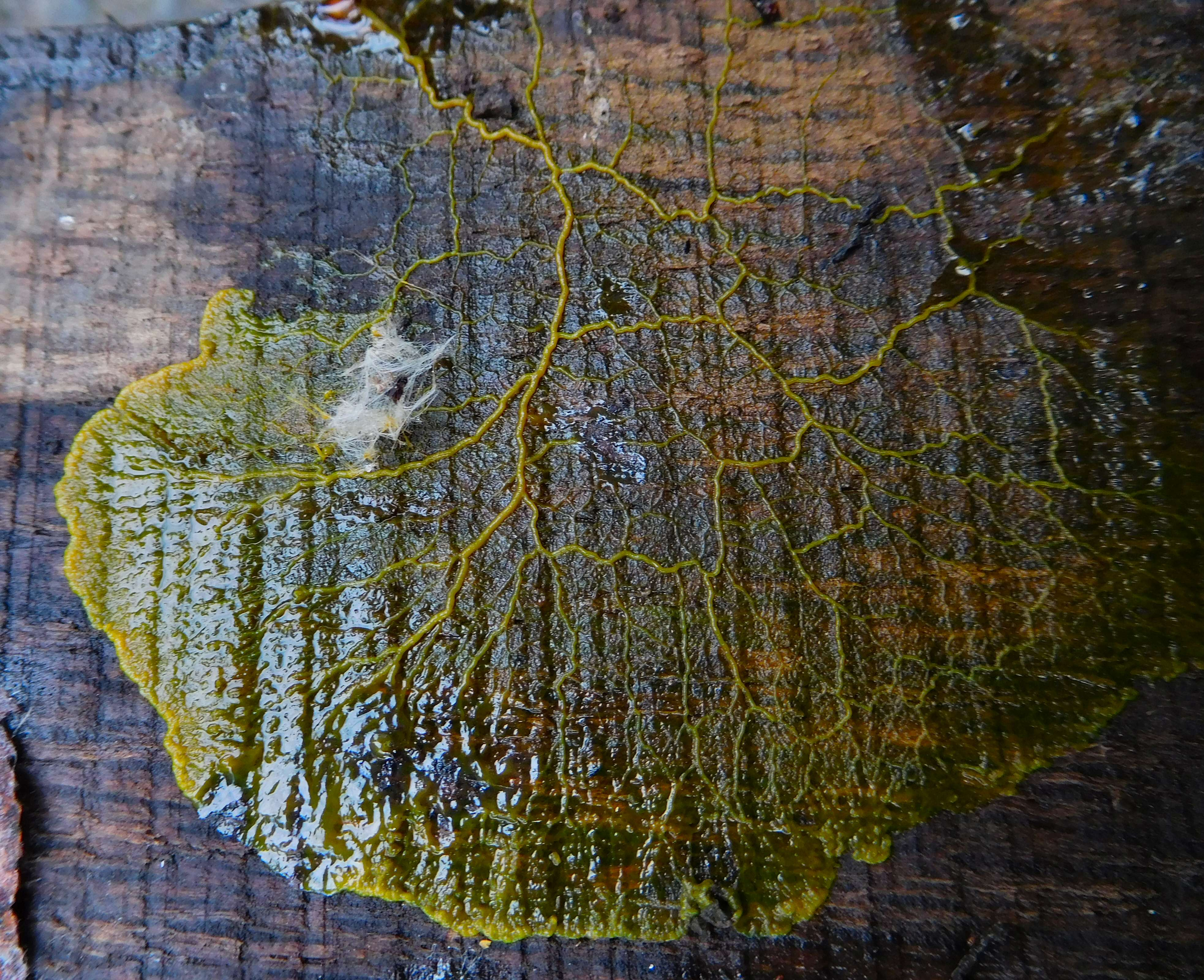
'The Blob' slime mould Physarum polycephalum on stored oak post after rain

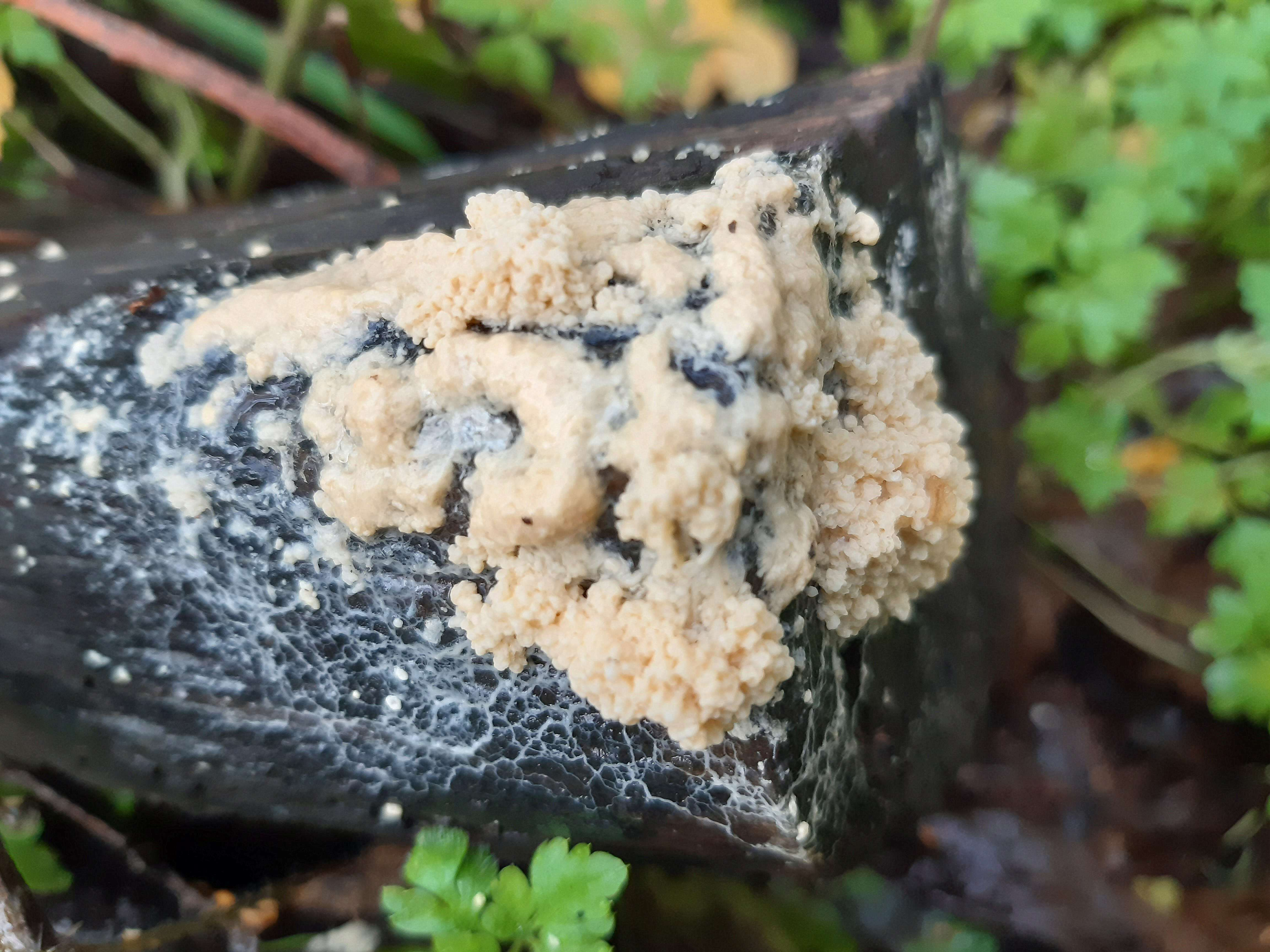
Dog's vomit slime mould, Mucilago crustacea

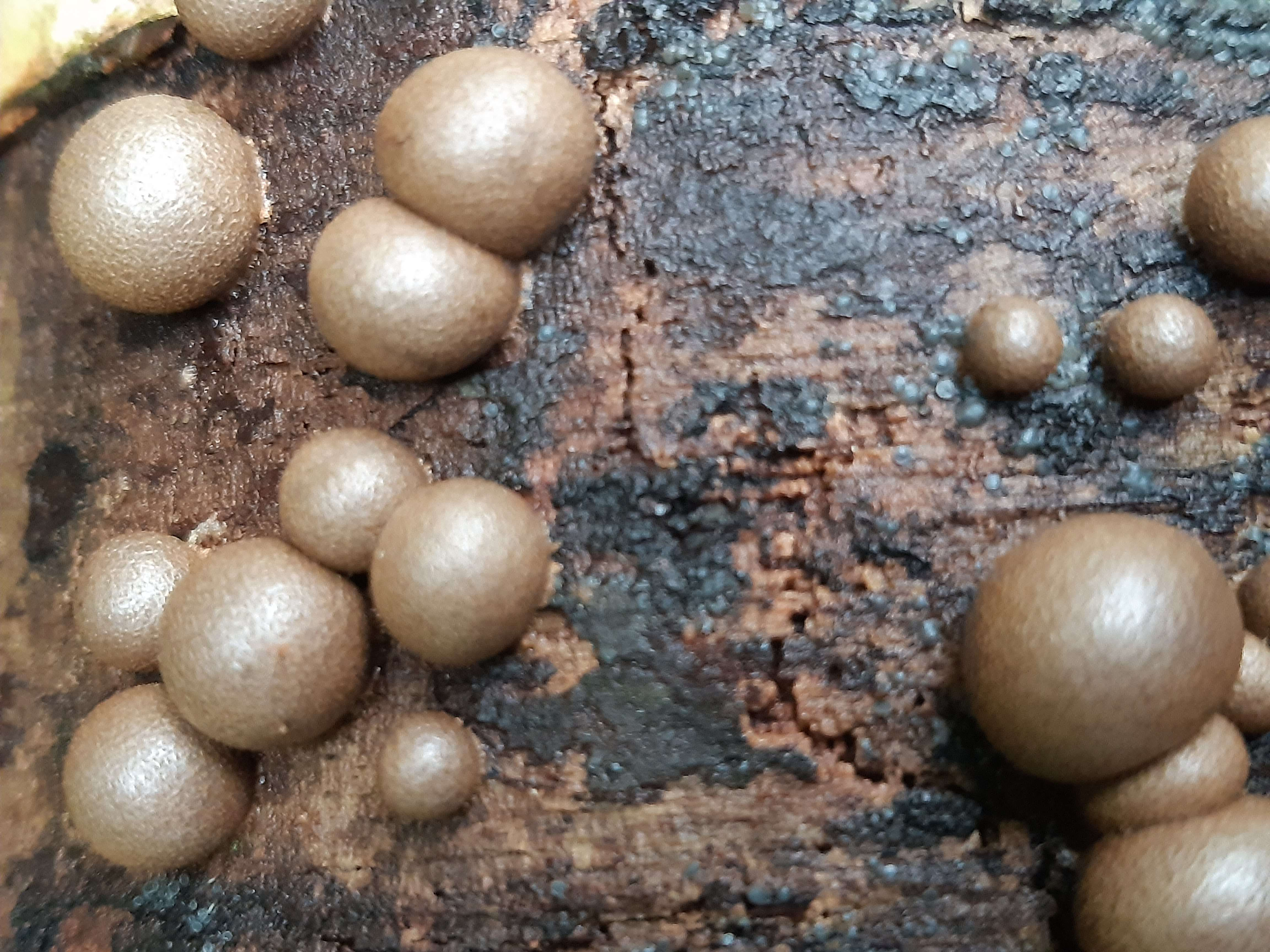
Wolf's milk slime mould, Lycogala terrestre

==== Plants ====
'Lower' plants
'Lower' plants

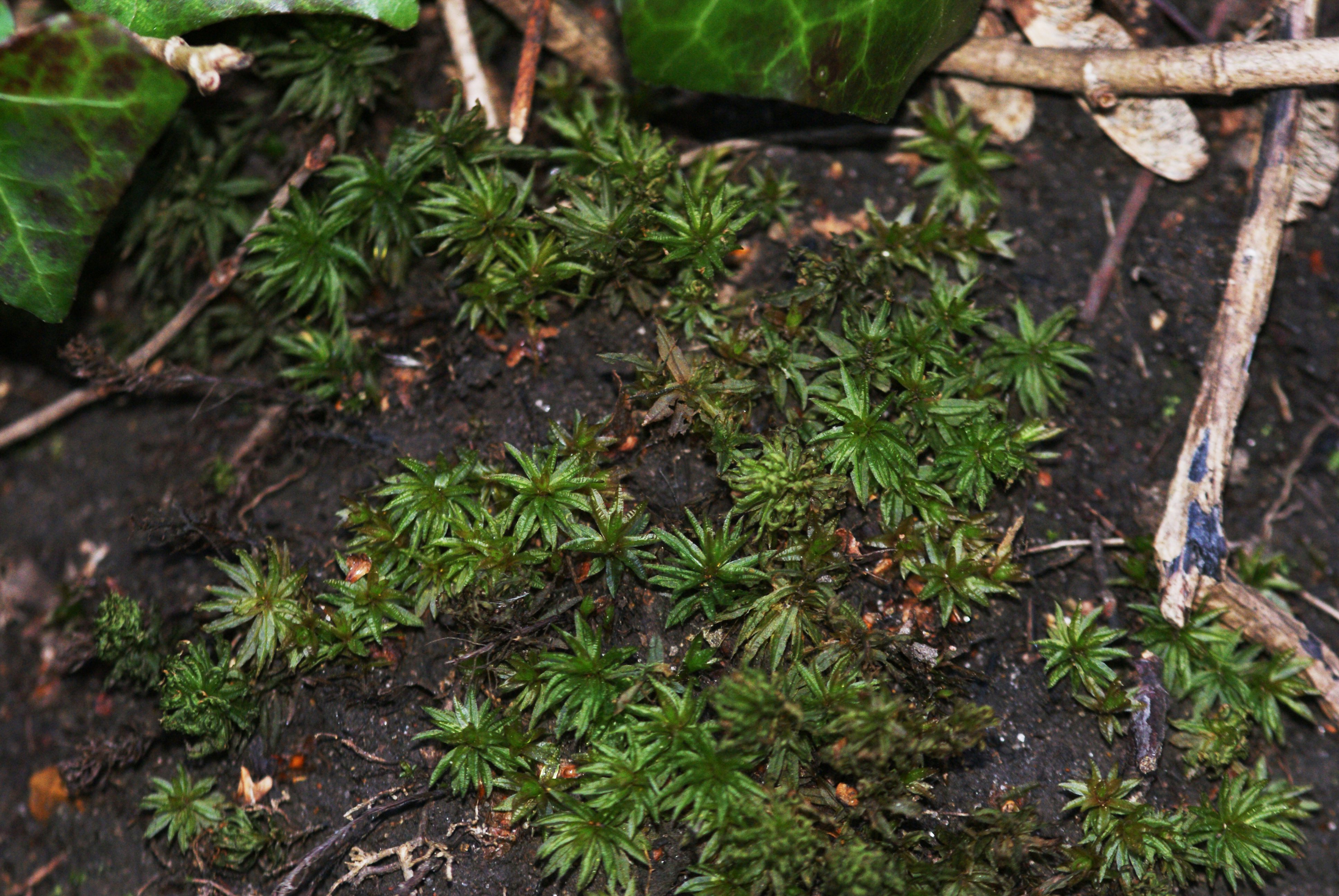
Common smoothcap moss, Atrichum undulatum

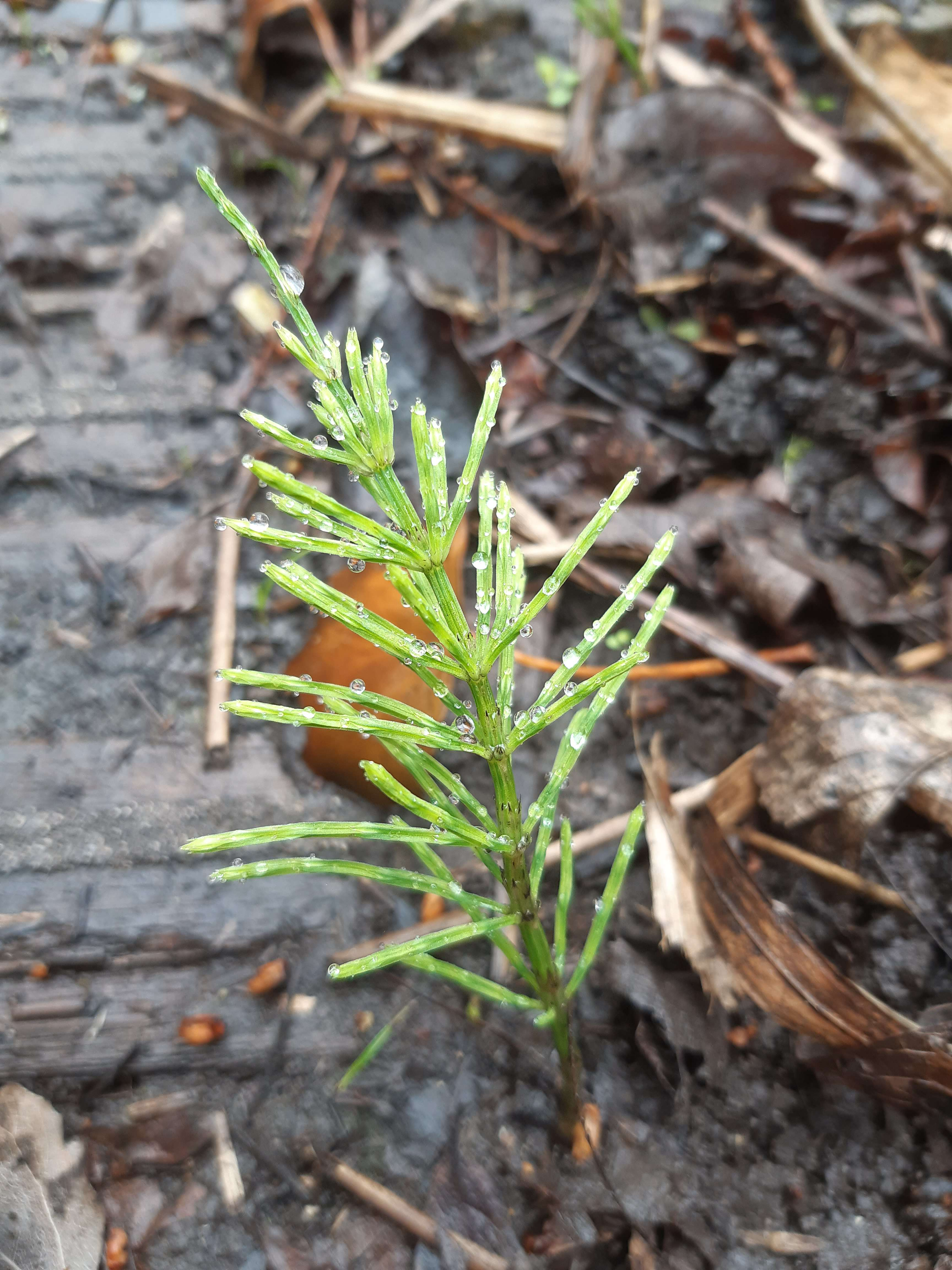
Field horsetail (fern ally), Equisetum arvense

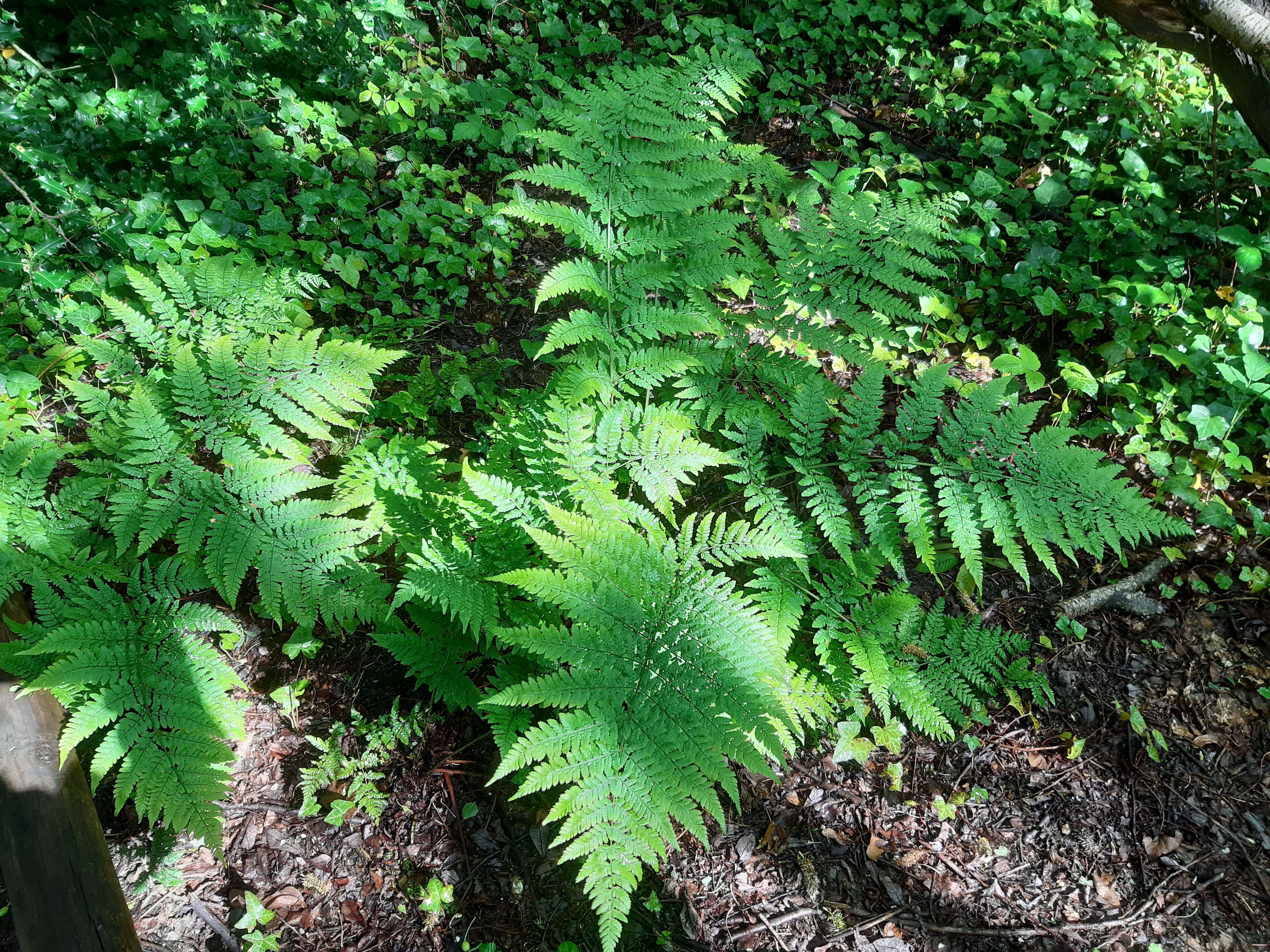
Male fern, Dryopteris filix-mas

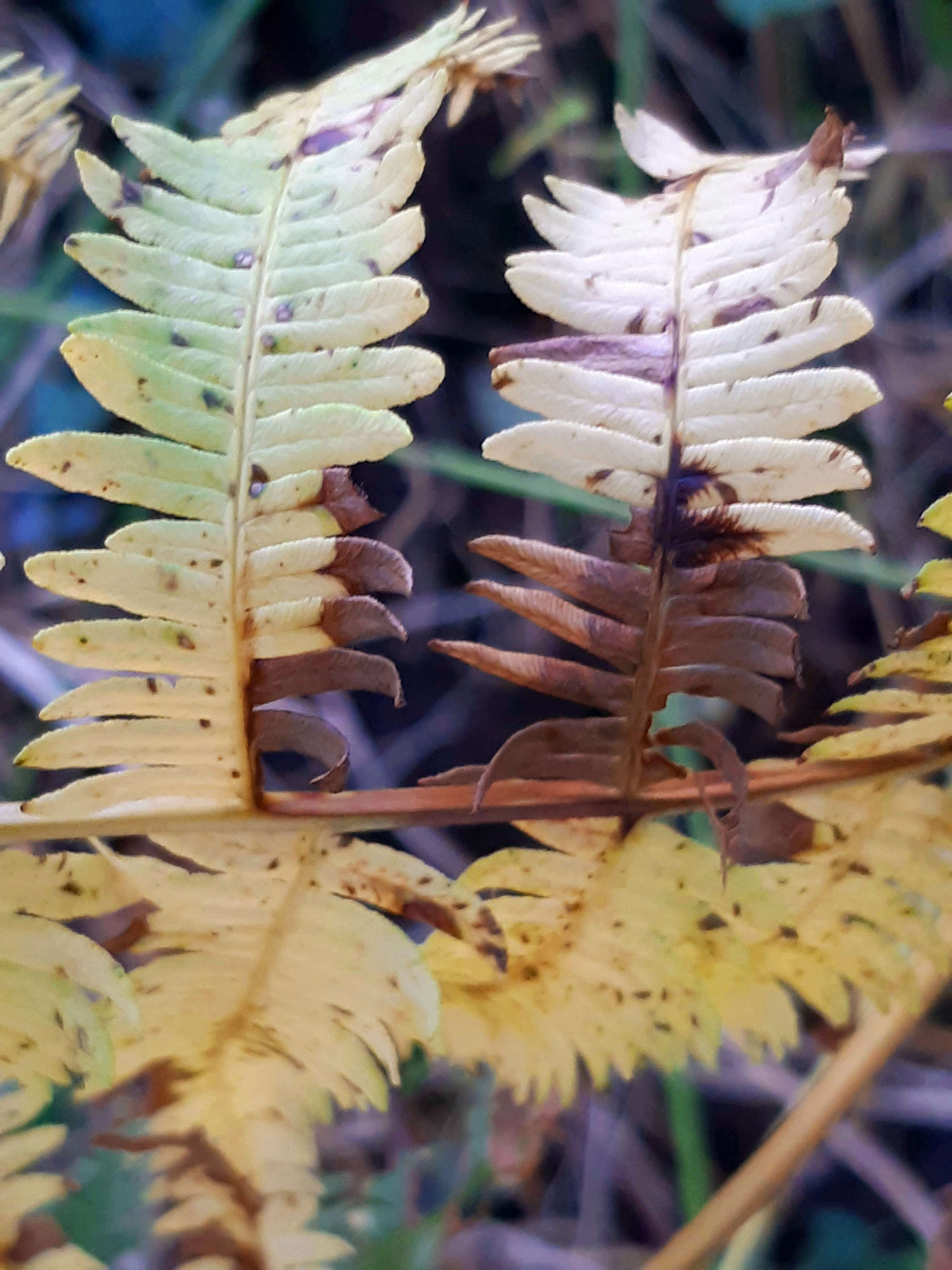
Bracken, Pteridium aquilinum, in November

Dicots
Dicots

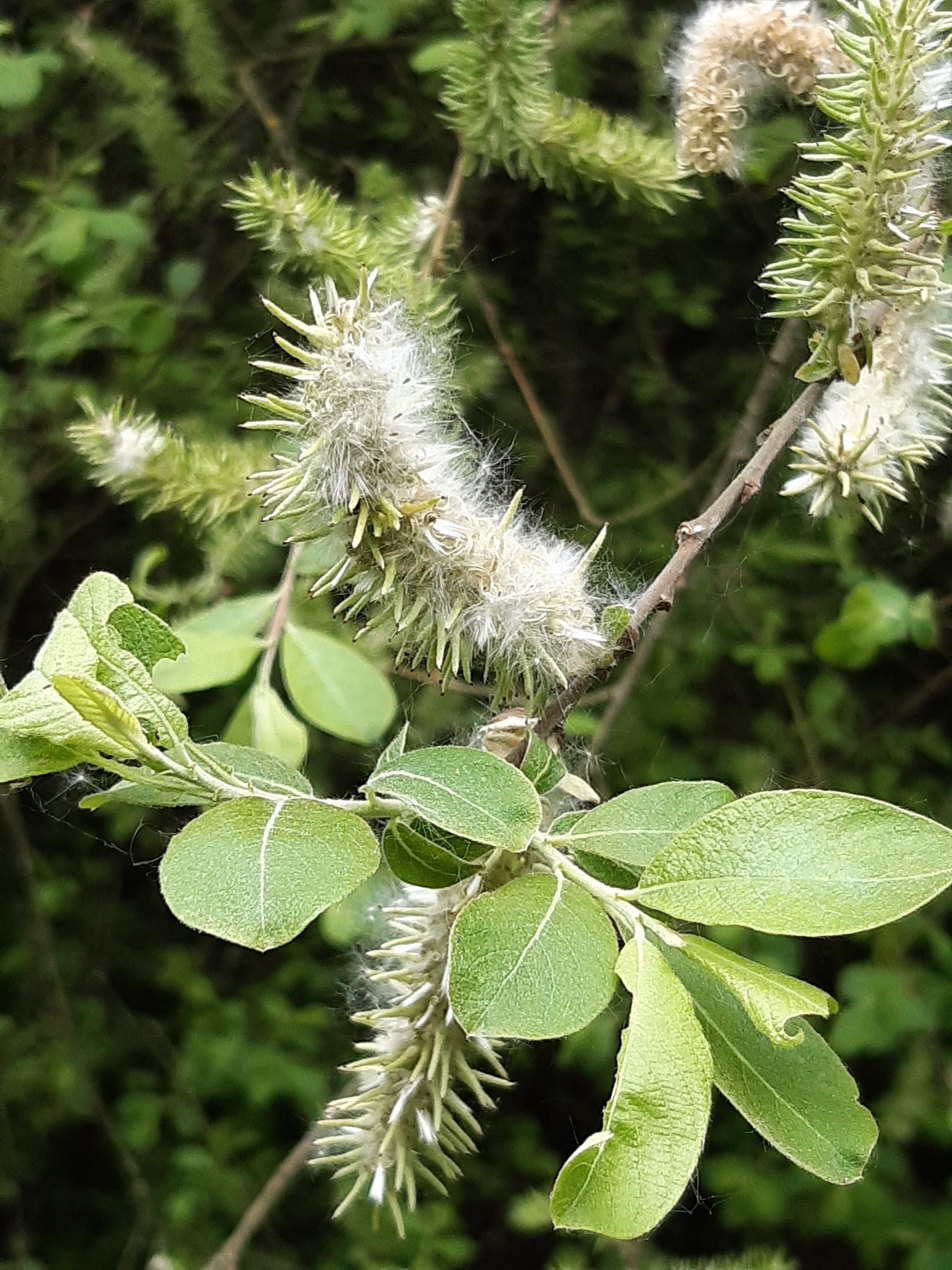
Sallow (goat willow), Salix caprea. by main pond. Much of the local willow is hybrid.

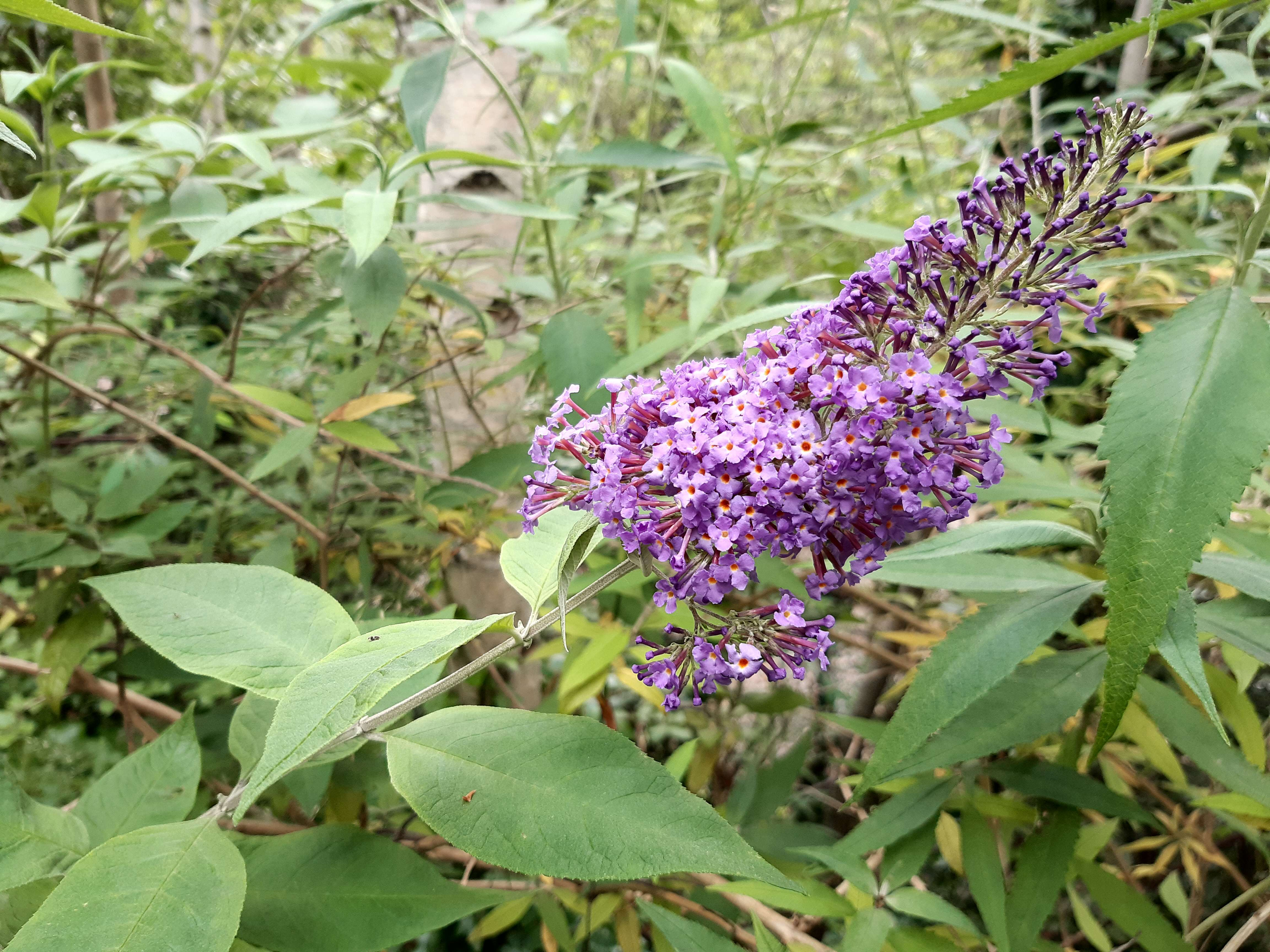
Buddleia, Buddleja davidii, naturalised on mound

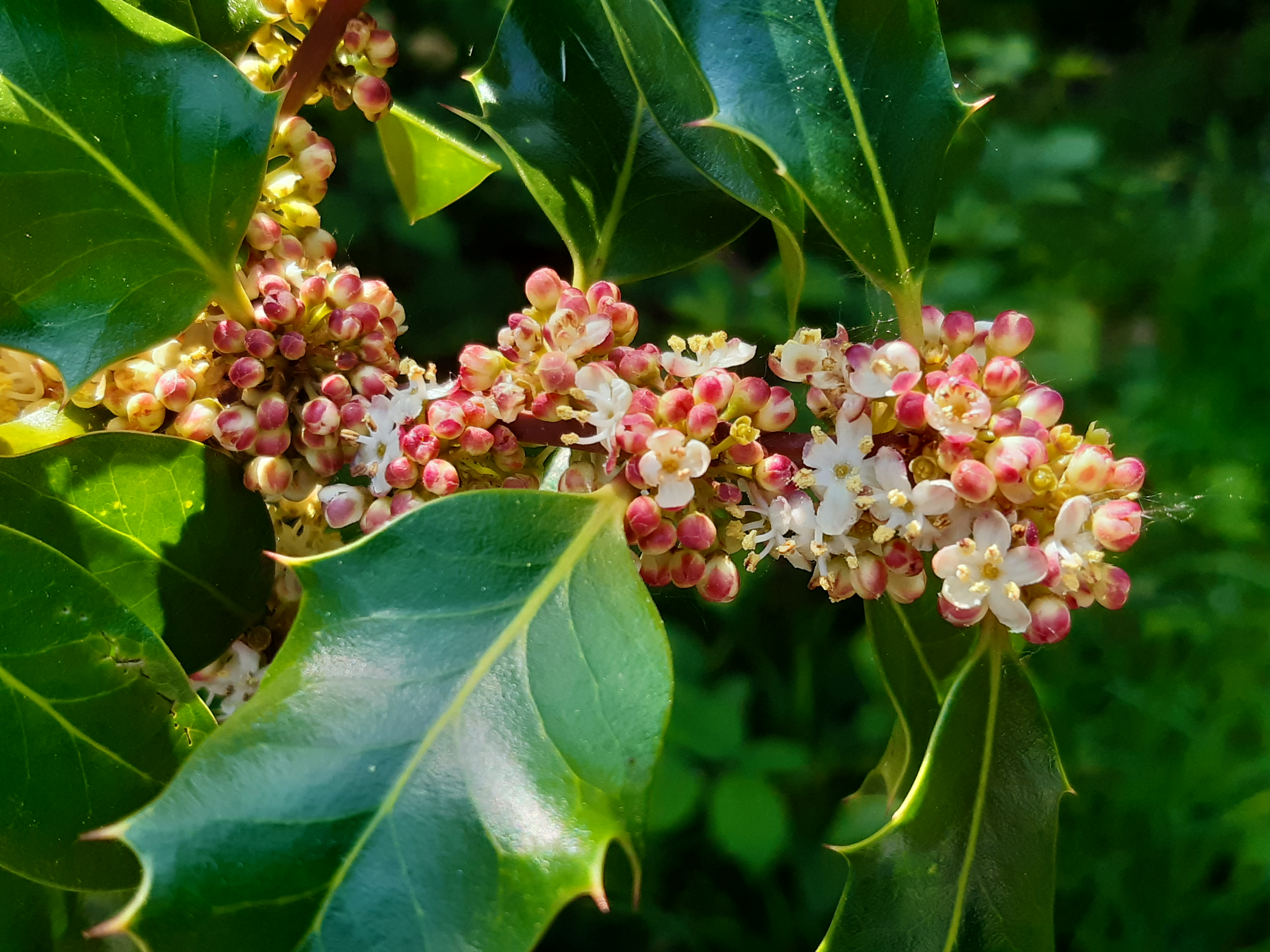
Holly, Ilex aquifolium, with male flowers

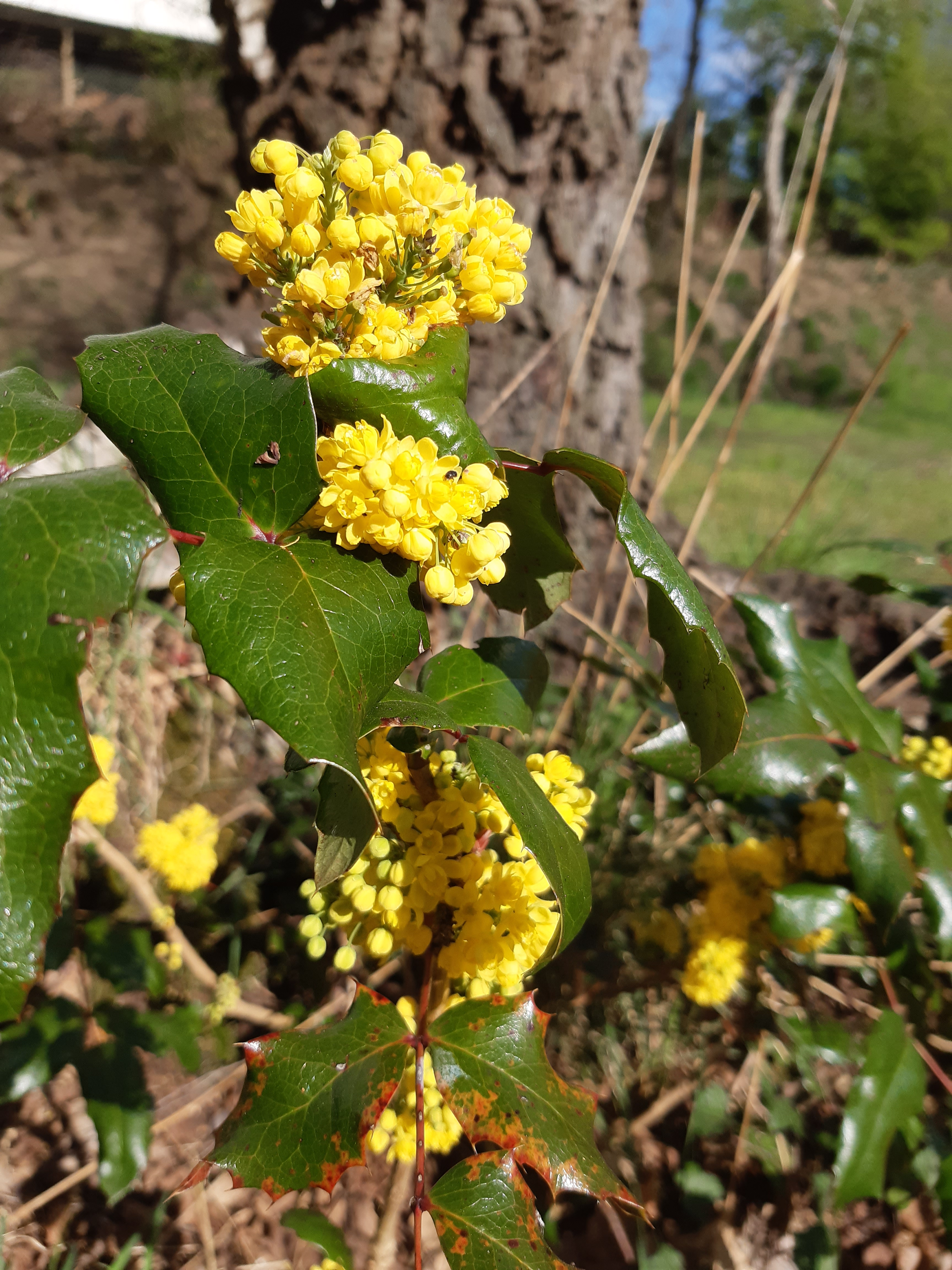
Mahonia (Oregon grape) naturalised under birches on Anthill Meadow

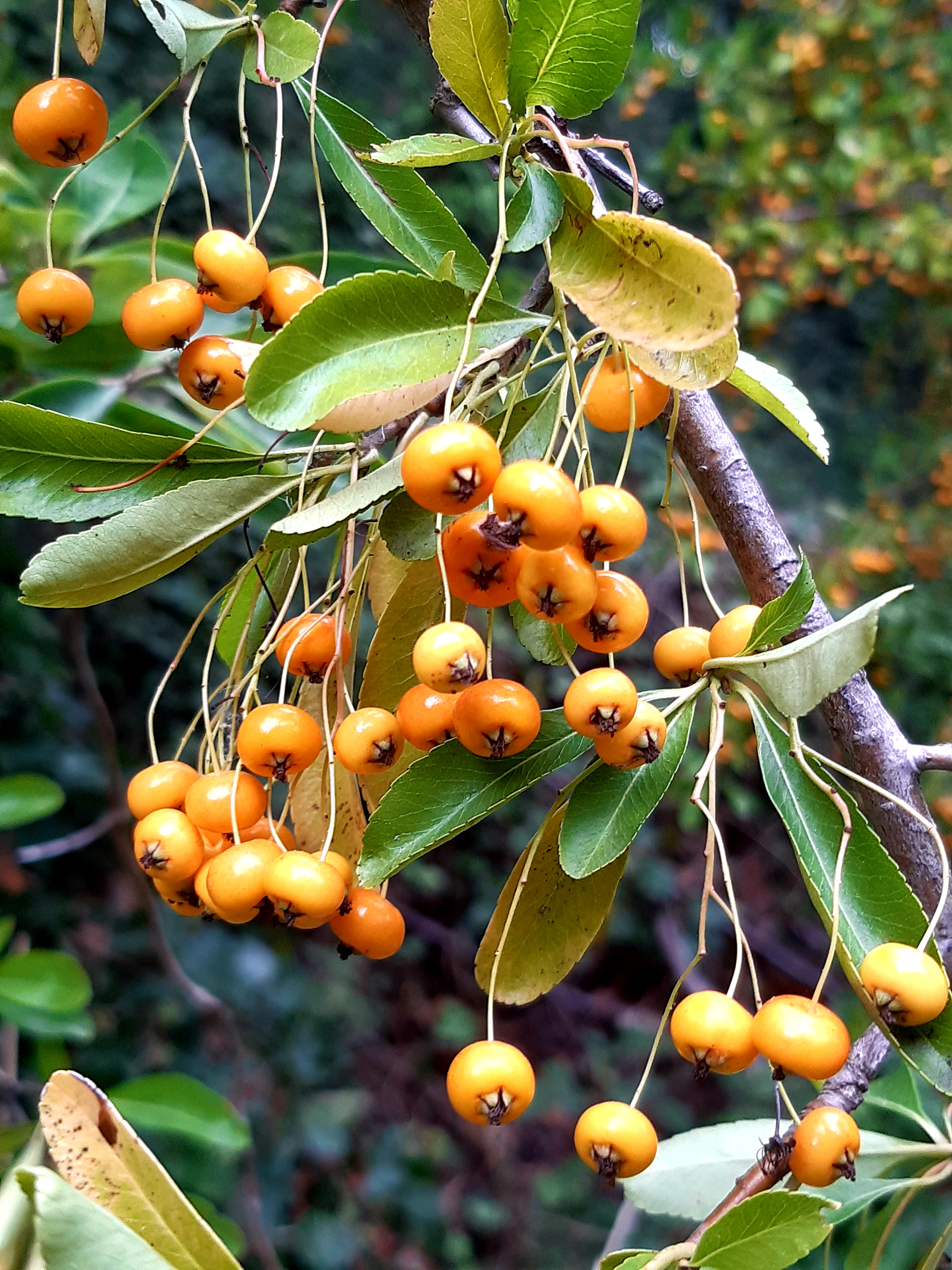
Narrowleaf firethorn, Pyracantha angustifolia in fruit

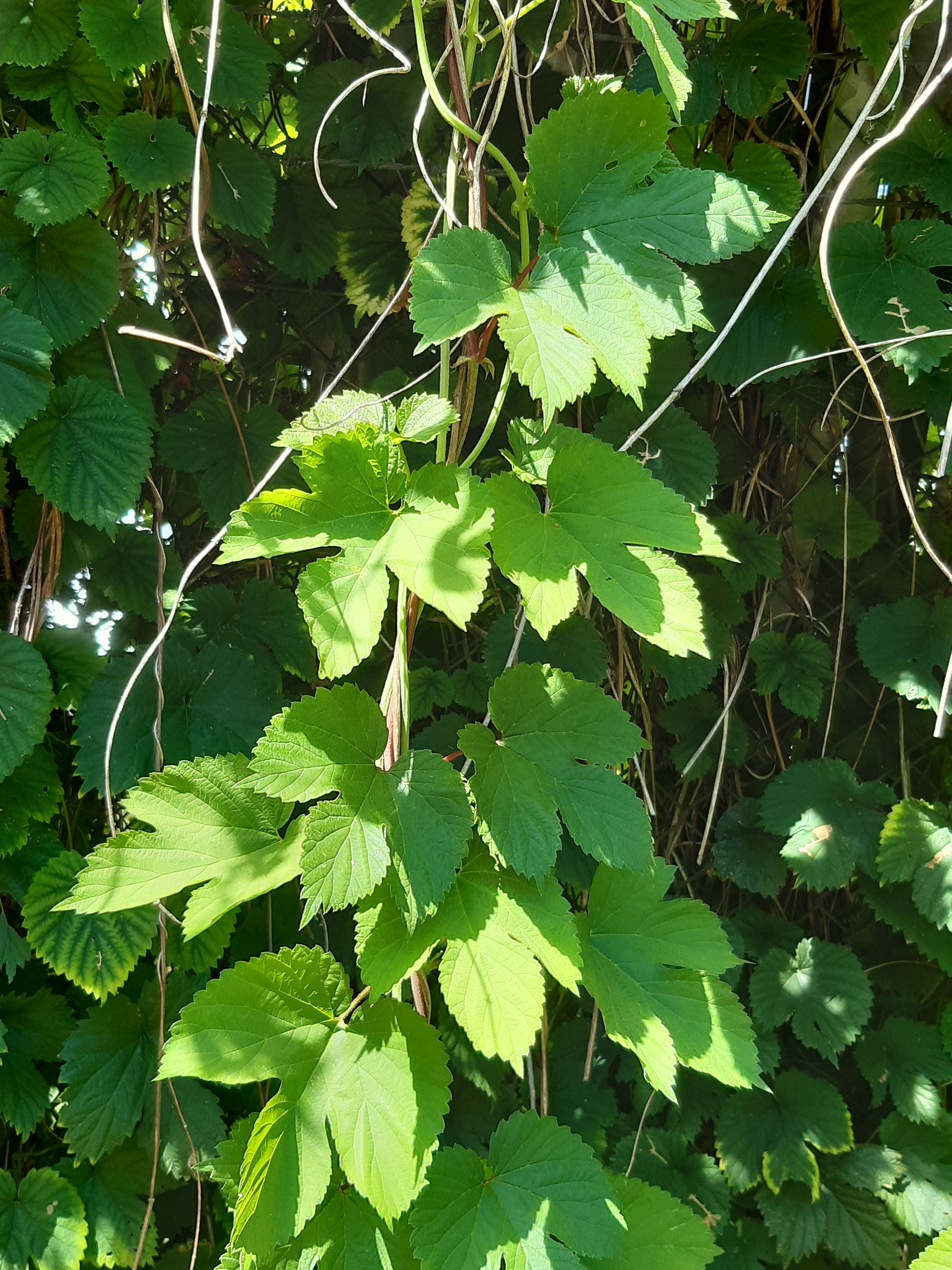
Hops, Humulus lupulus, on Ramp Meadow fence

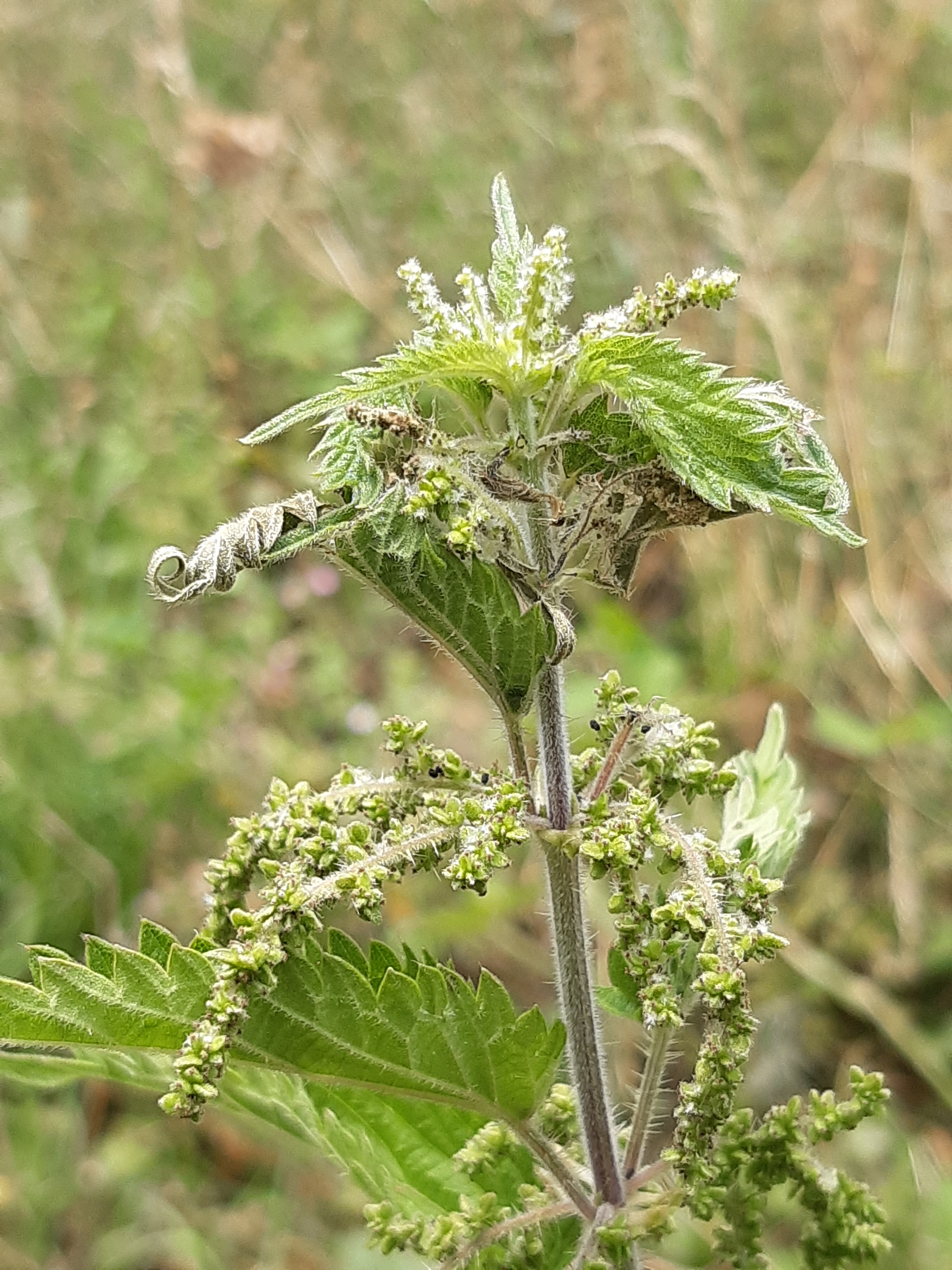
Stinging nettle, Urtica dioica, on Ramp Meadow

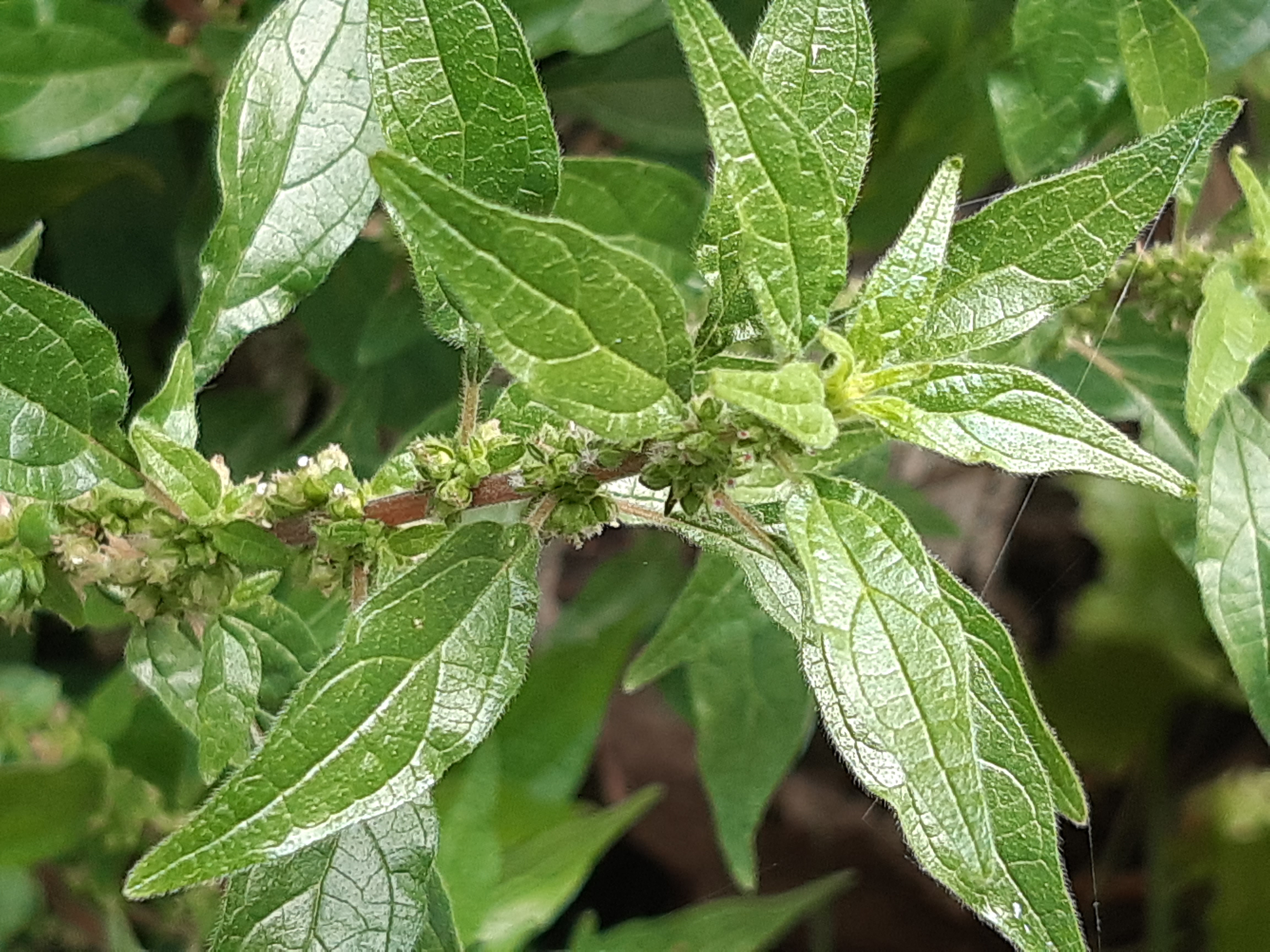
Pellitory of the wall, Parietaria officinalis, in car park

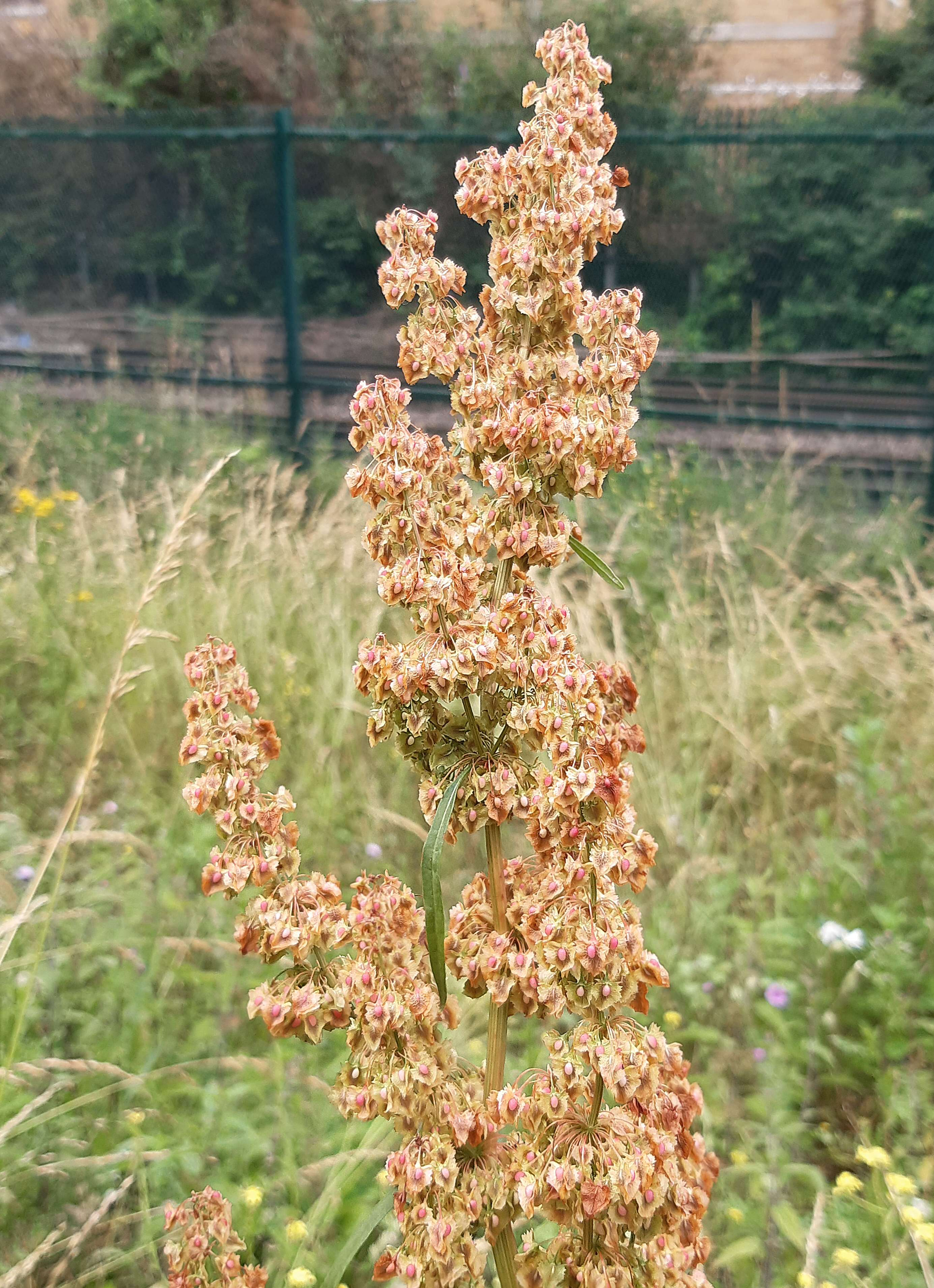
Broad-leaved dock, Rumex obtusifolius, on Ramp Meadow

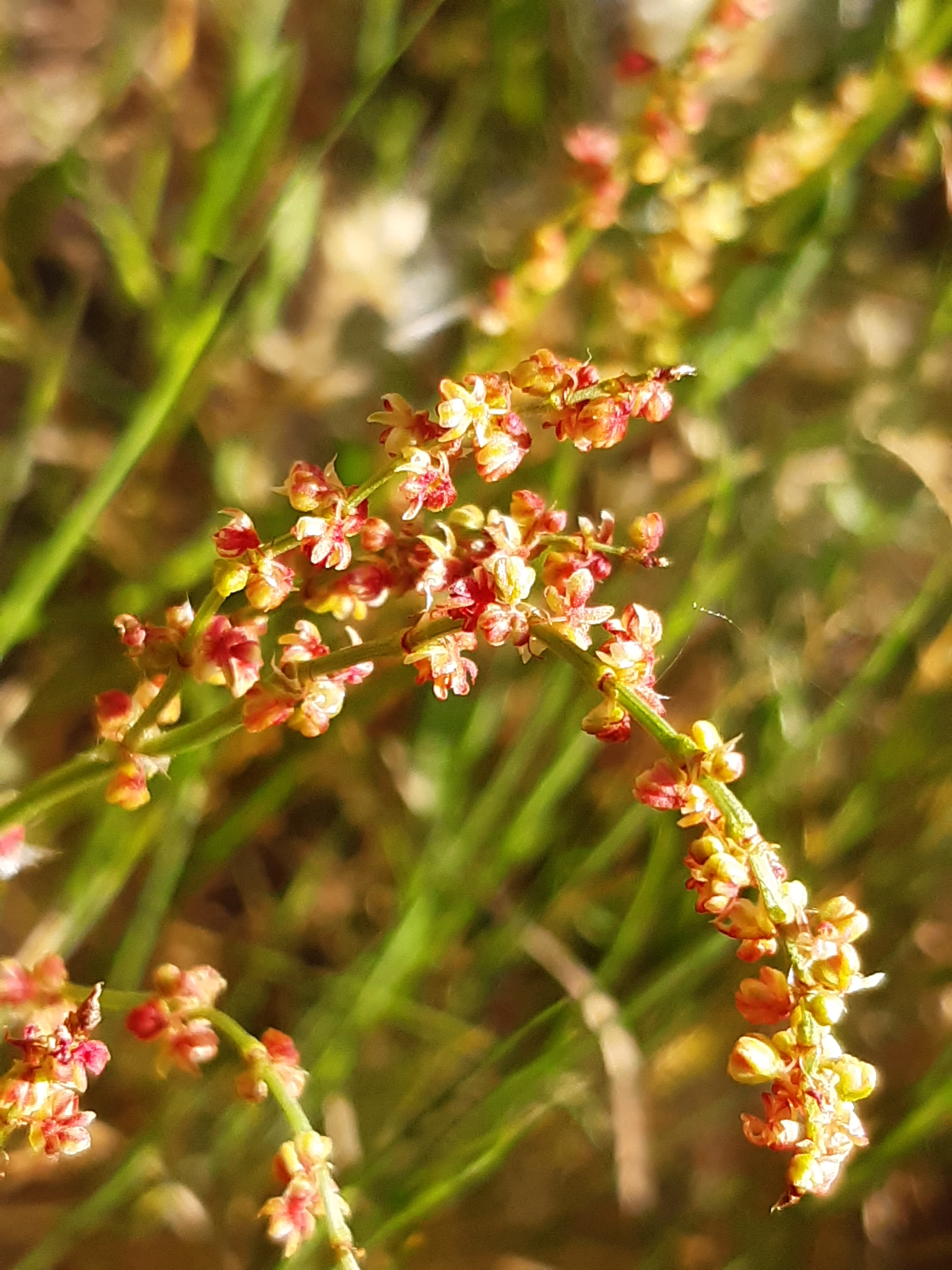
Sheep's sorrel, Rumex acetosella, in Picnic Meadow

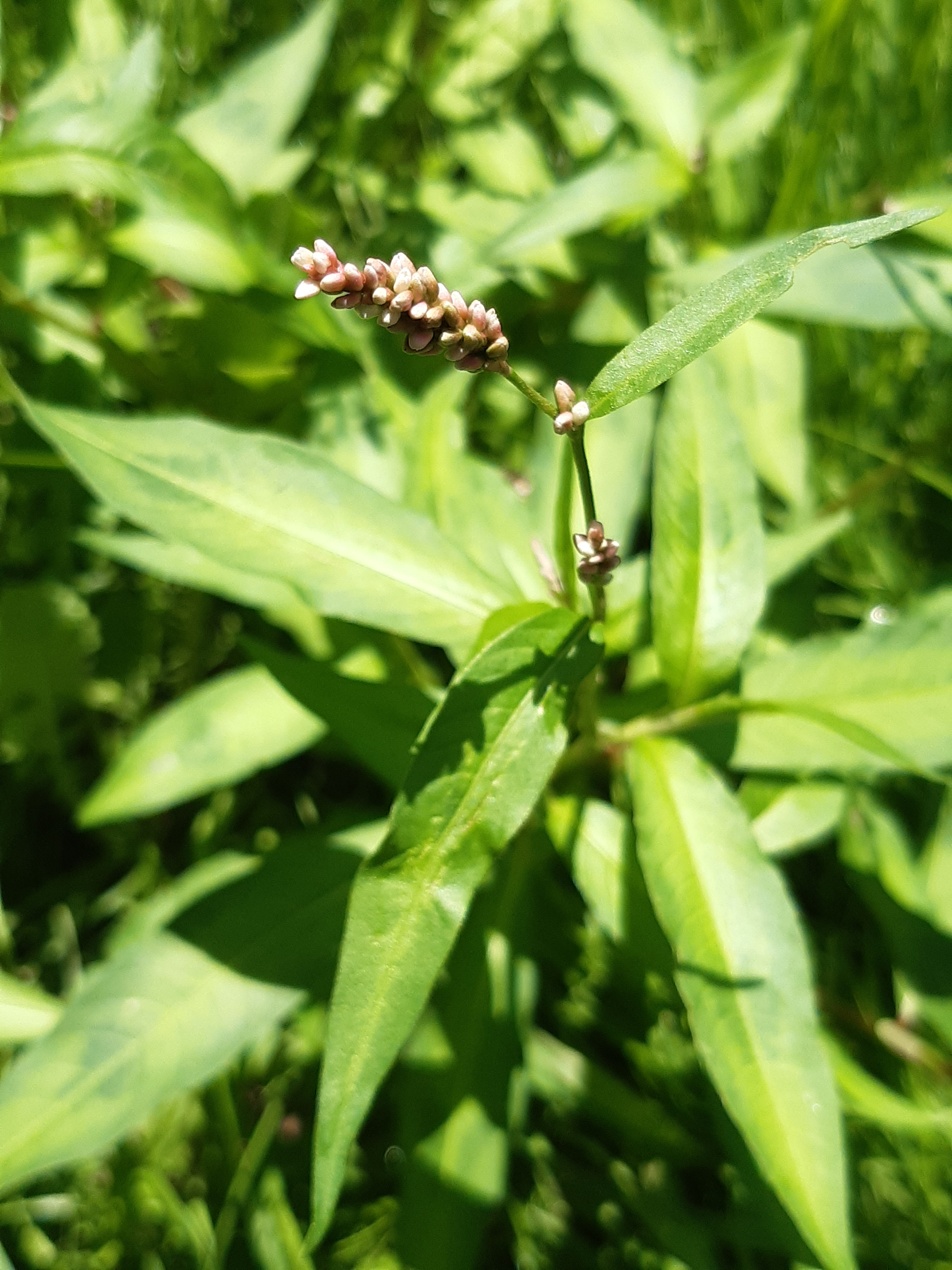
Redshank, Persicaria maculosa

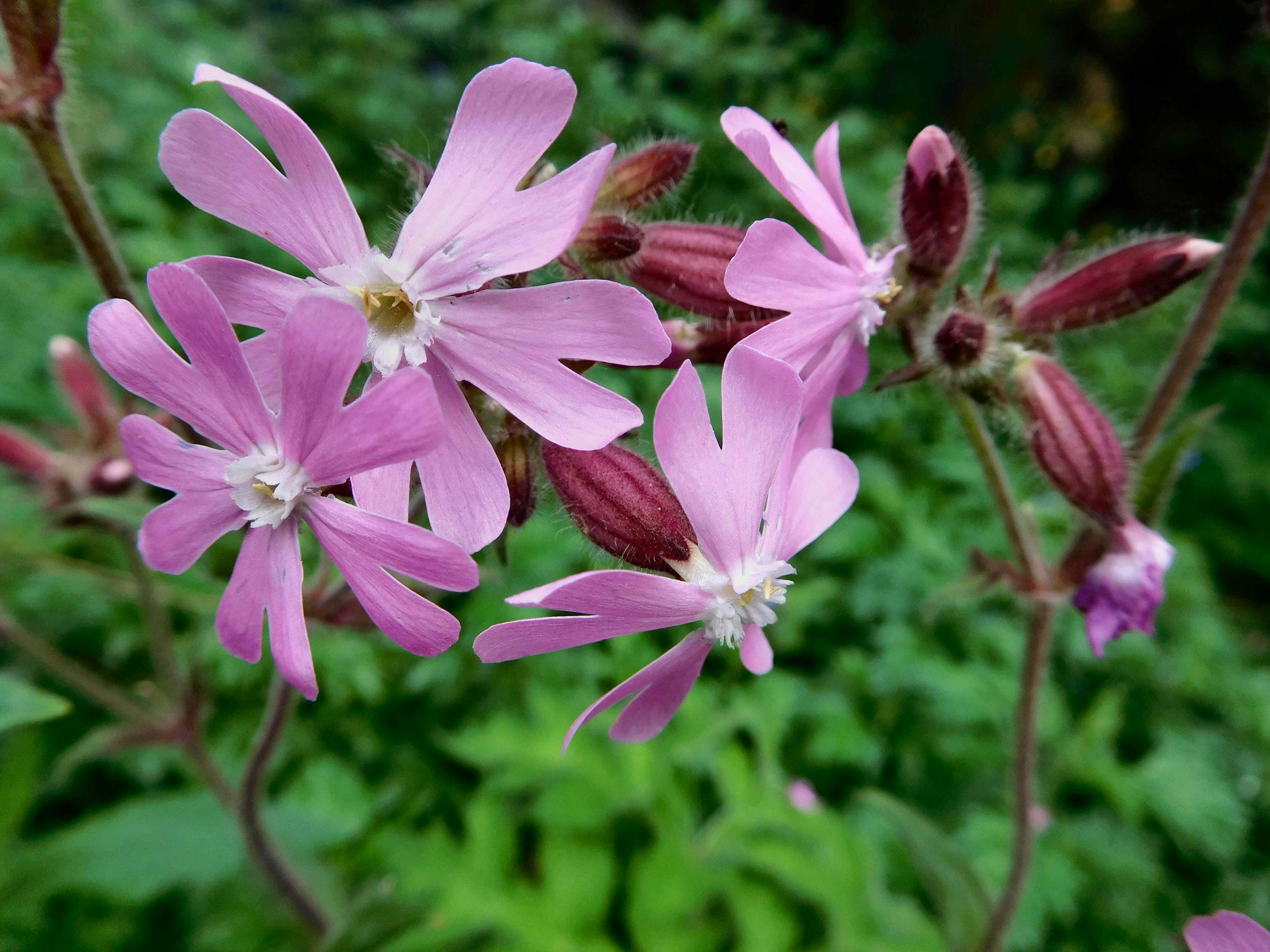
Red campion, Silene dioica, on ramp meadow

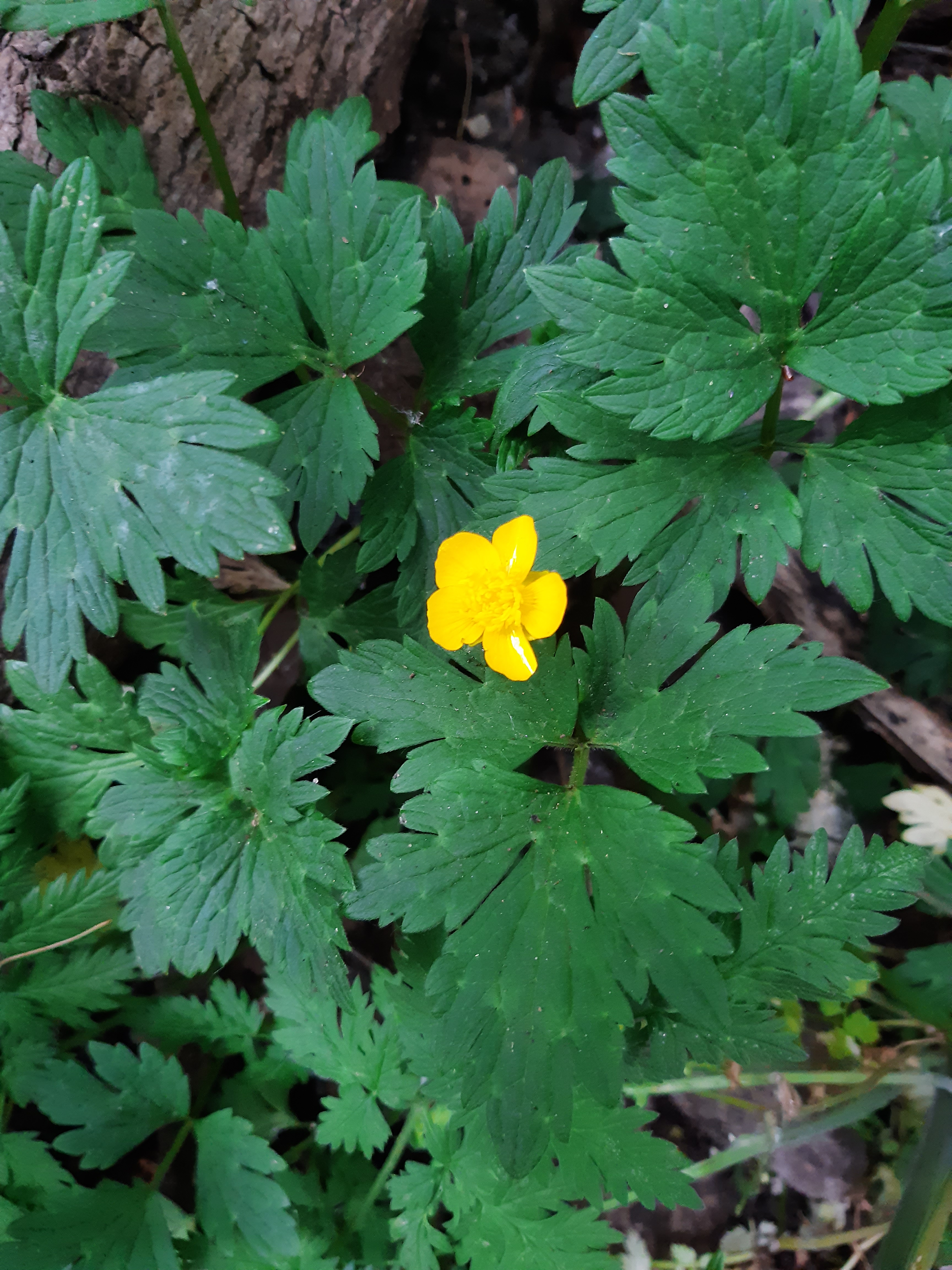
Creeping buttercup, Ranunculus repens, on Ramp Meadow

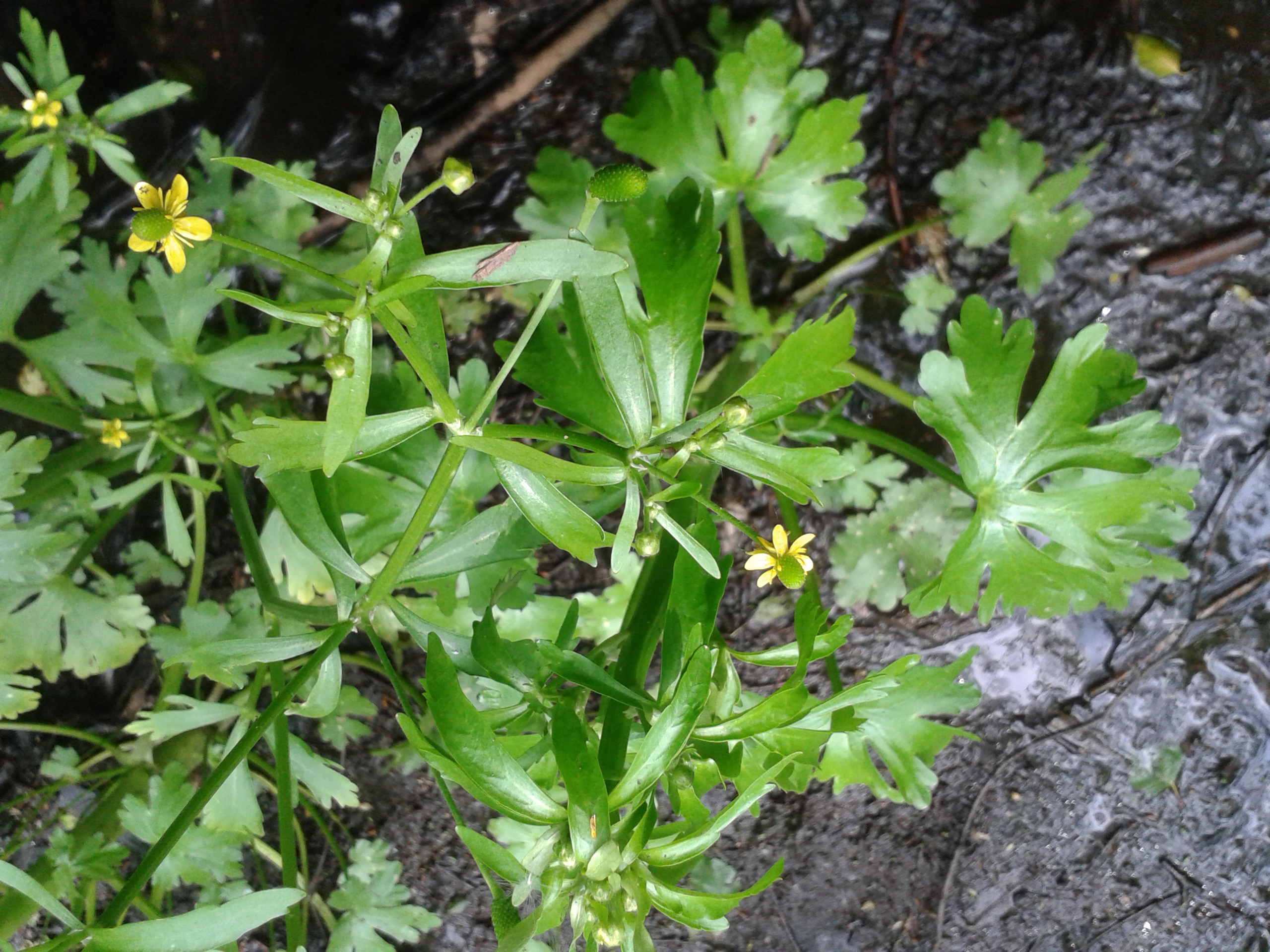
Celery-leaved buttercup, Ranunculus sceleratus, in the 'mangrove swamp'

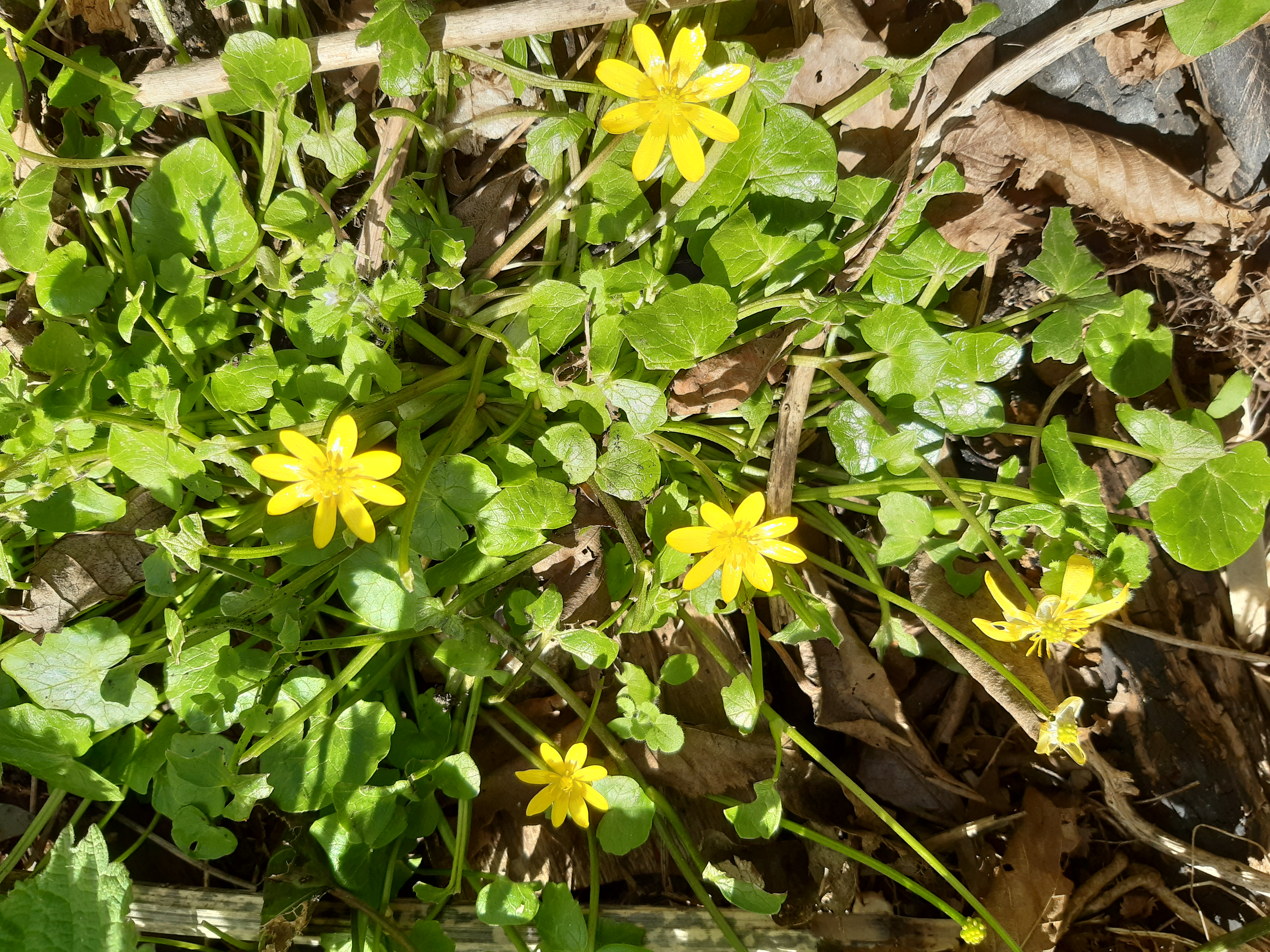
Lesser celandine, Ficaria verna, near car park

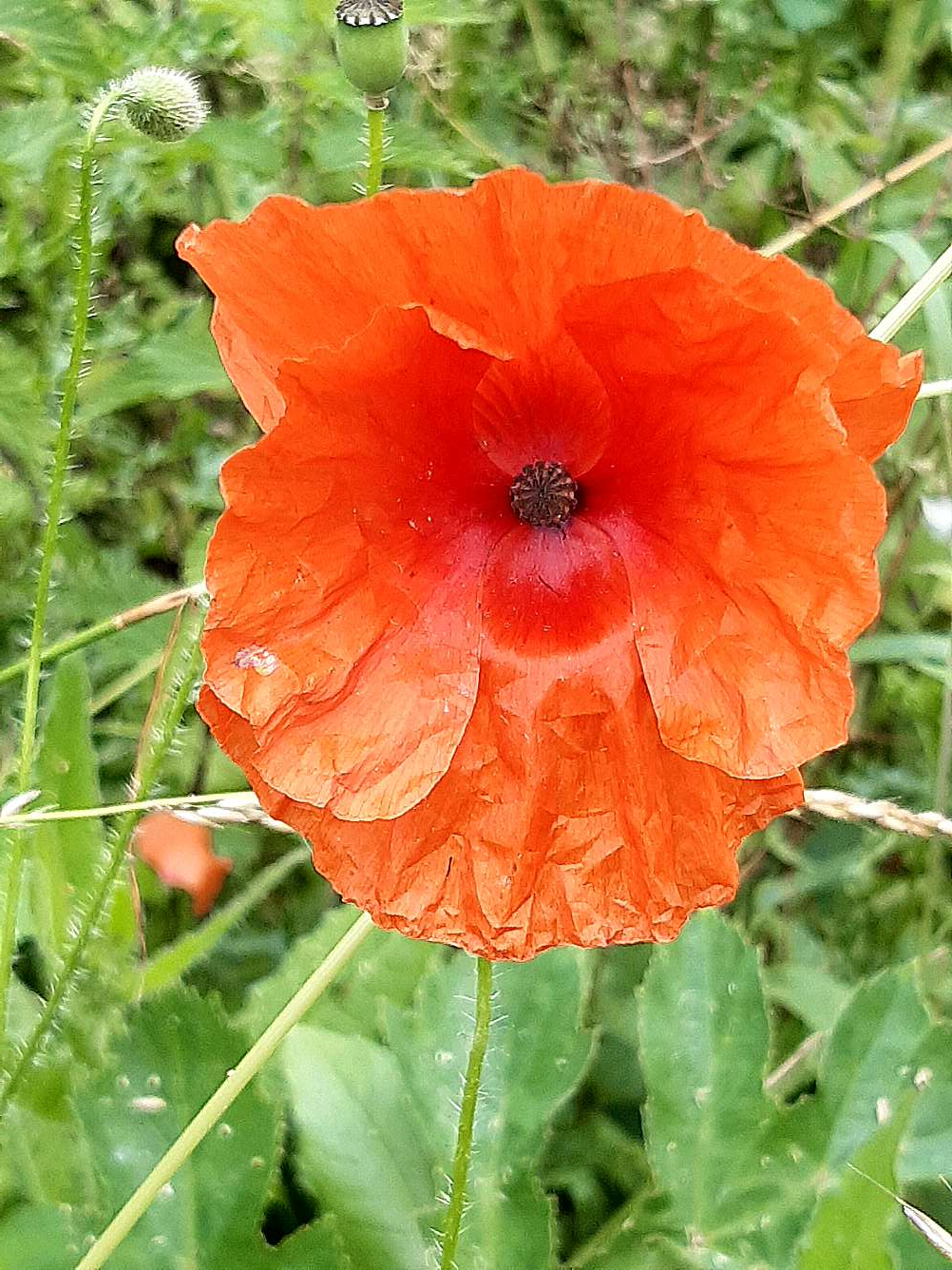
Poppy, Papaver rhoeas, on ramp meadow

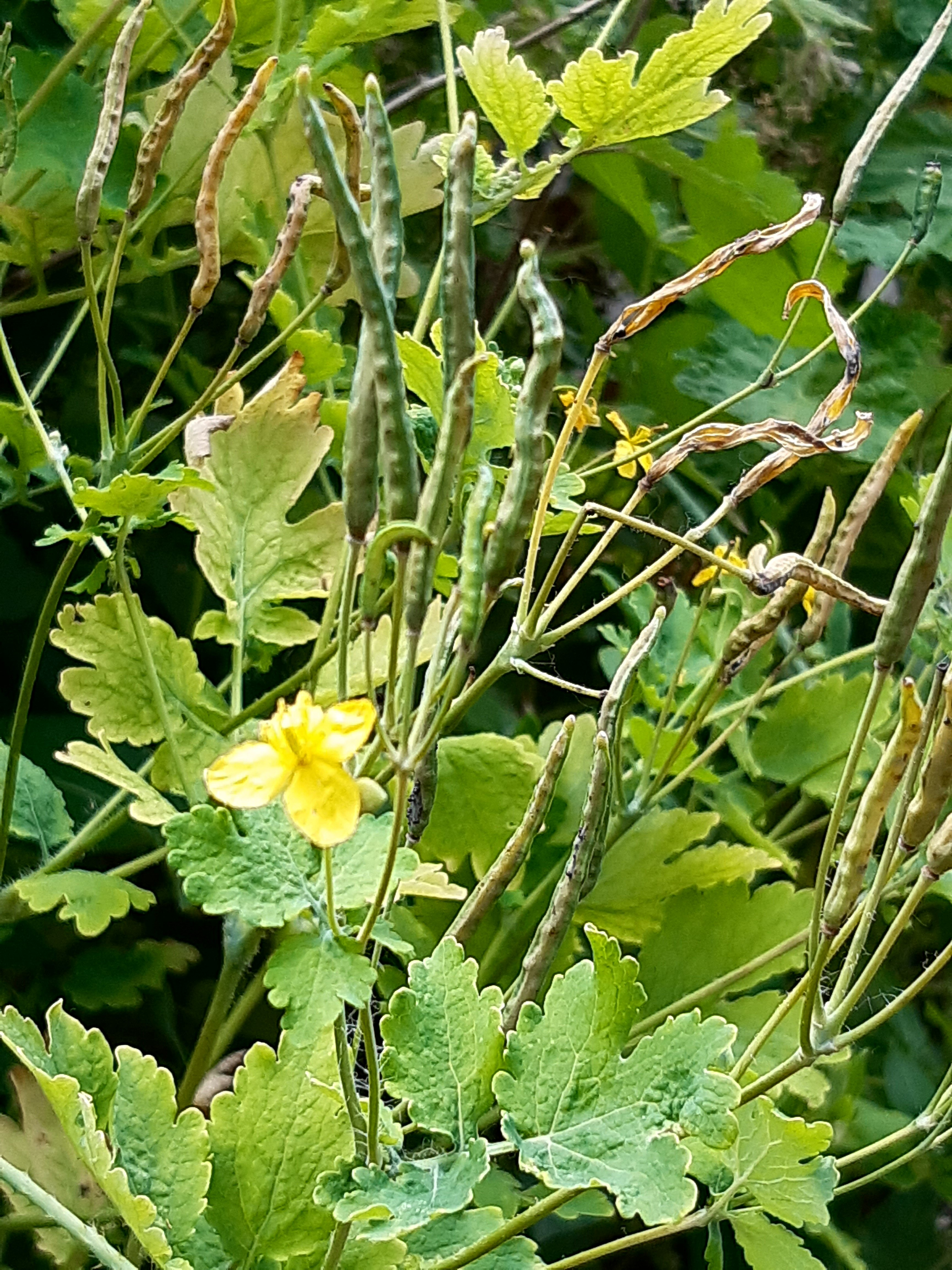
Greater Celandine, Chelidonium majus, by car park

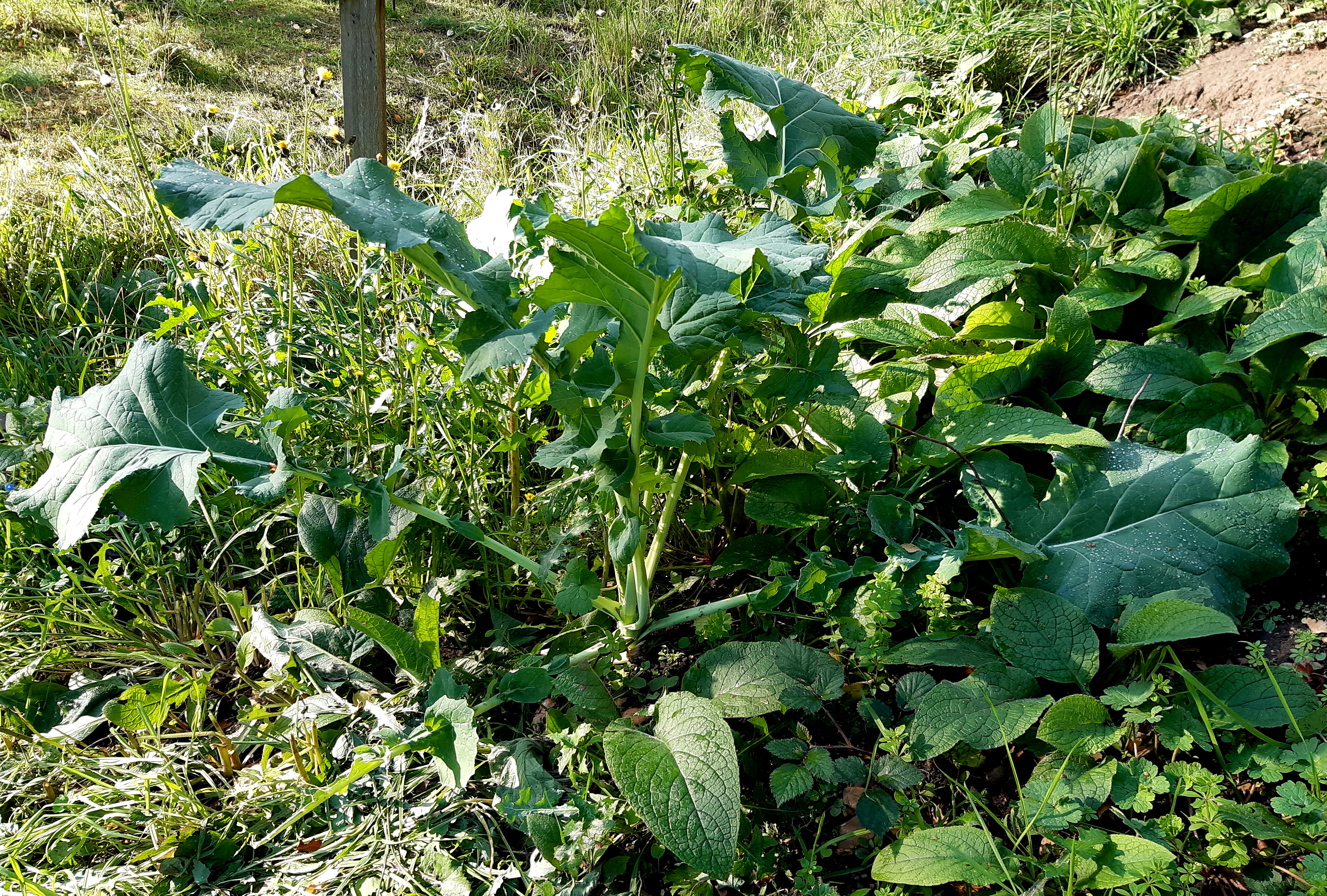
Cabbage, Brassica oleracea, next to Anthill Meadow

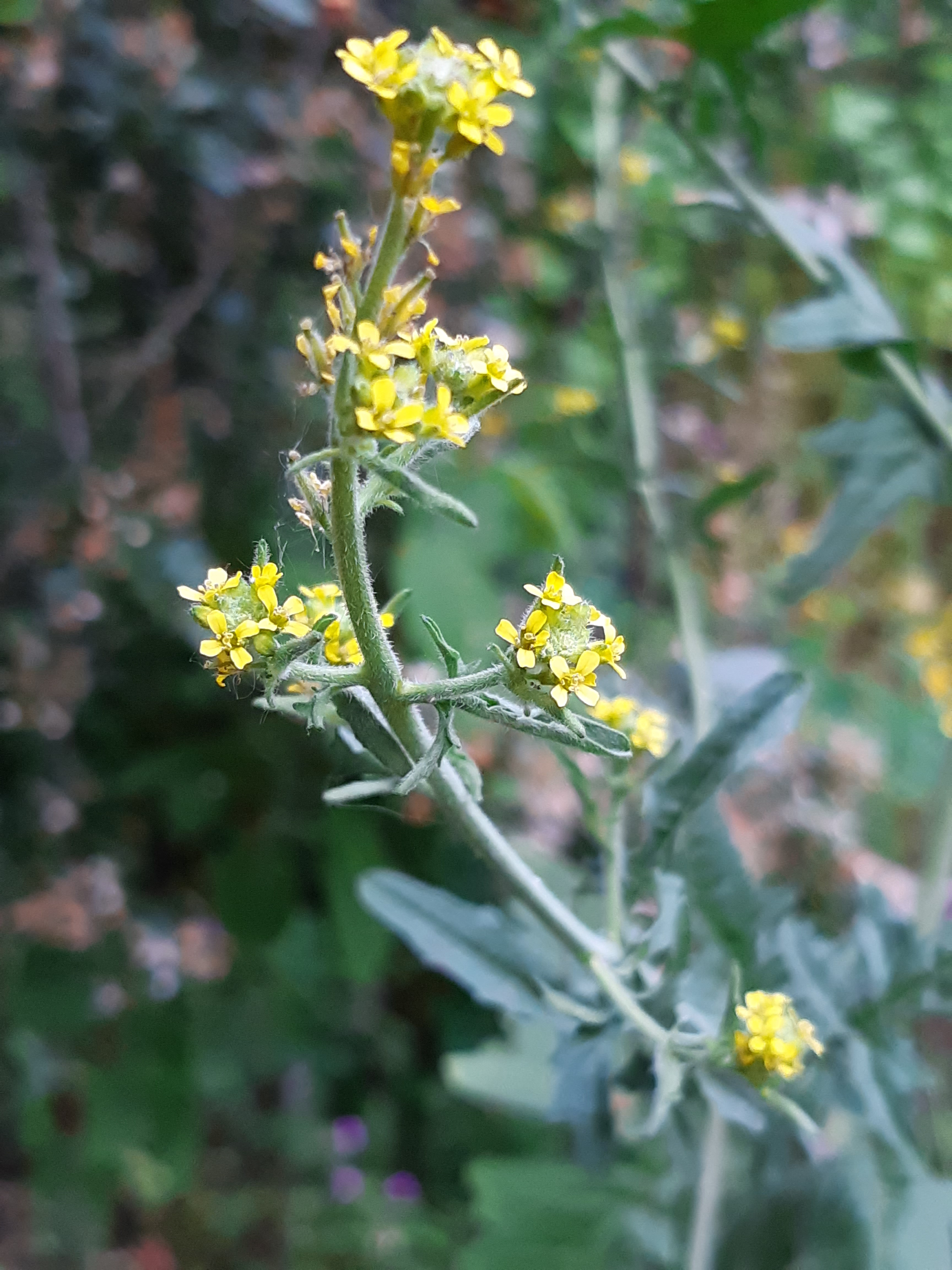
Hedge mustard, Sisymbrium officinale, in sunny clearings

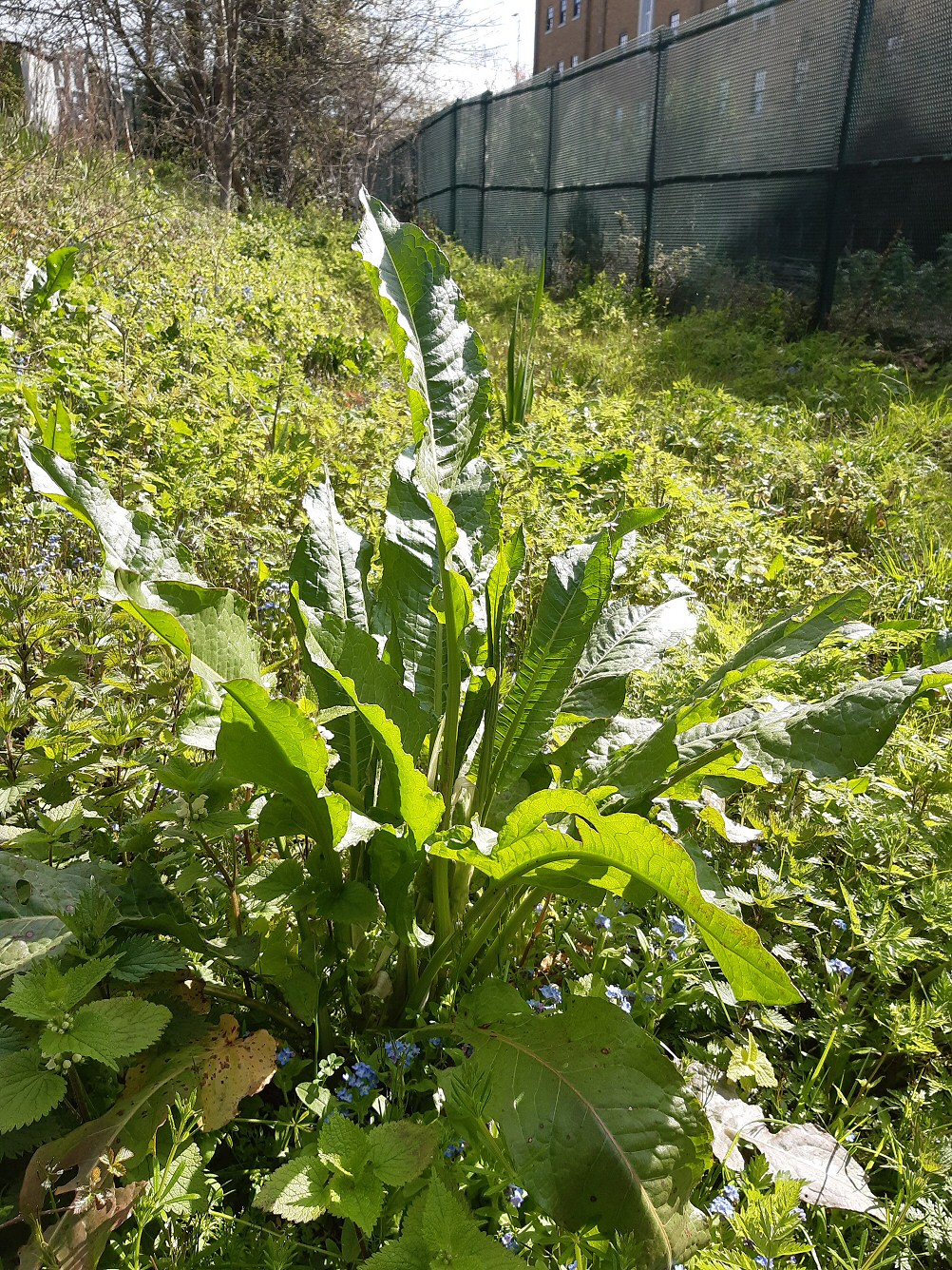
Horseradish, Armoracia rusticana on ramp meadow

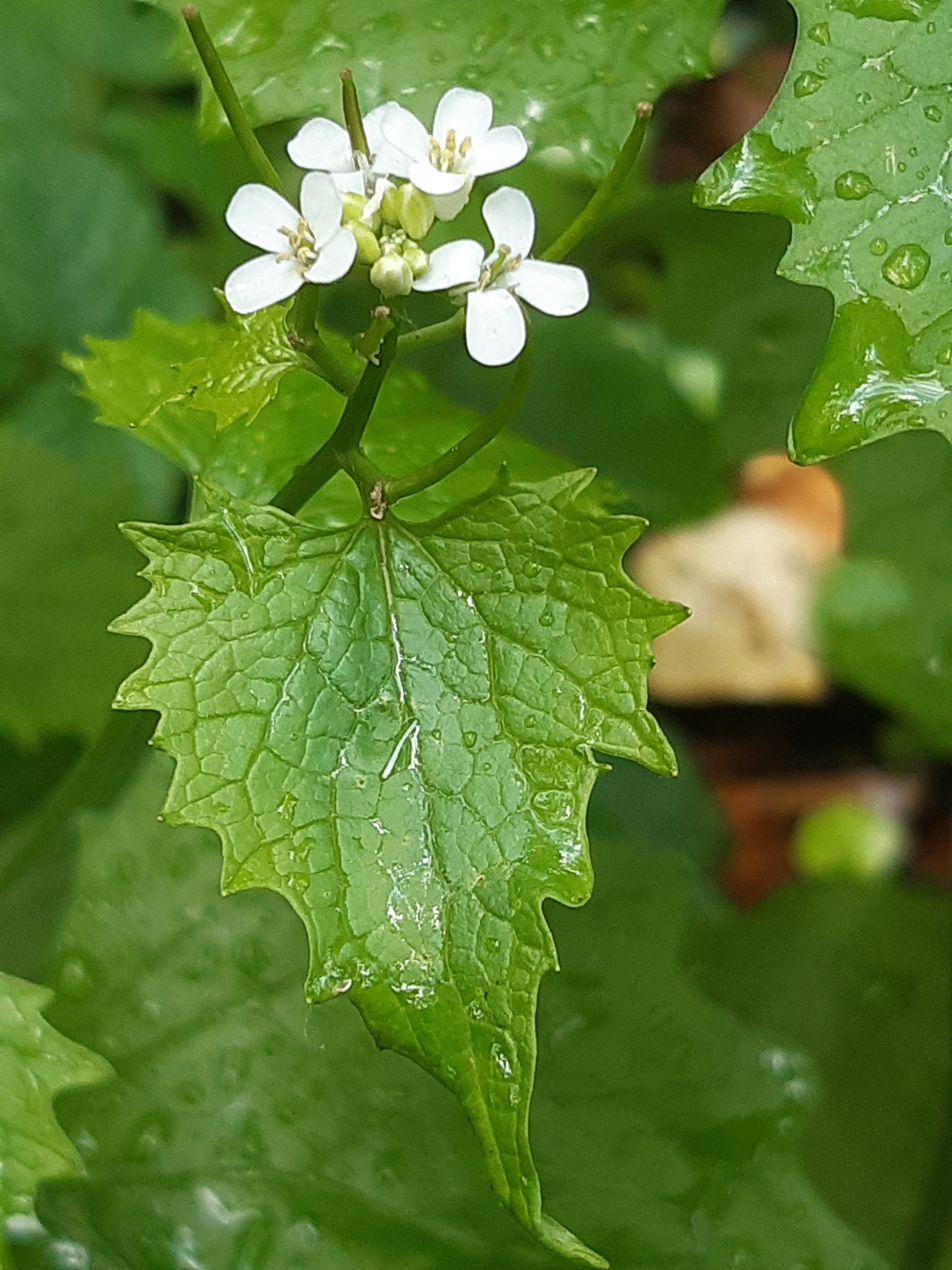
Garlic mustard, Alliaria petiolata, on ramp meadow

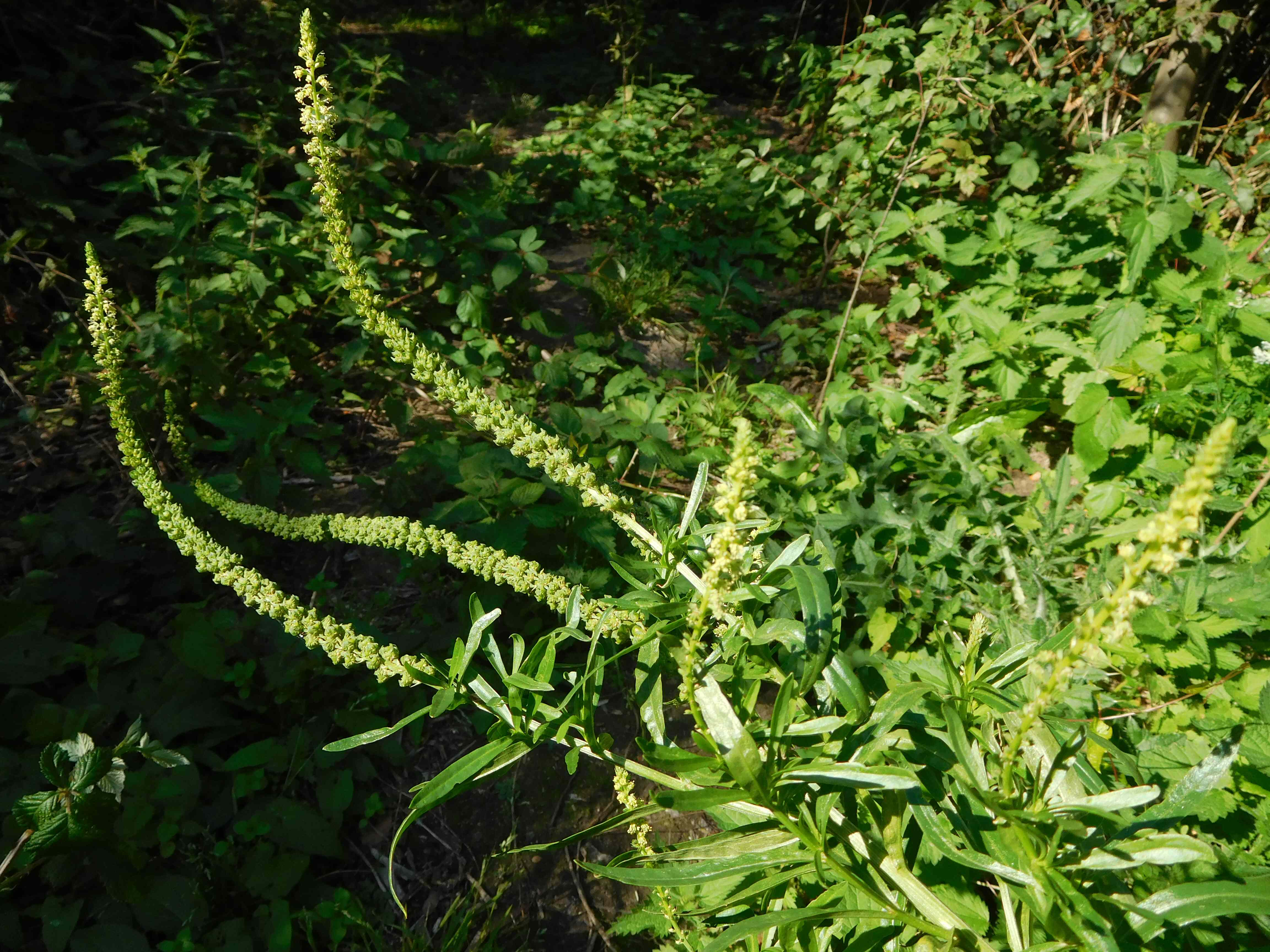
Weld or dyer's rocket, Reseda luteola, on disturbed bank

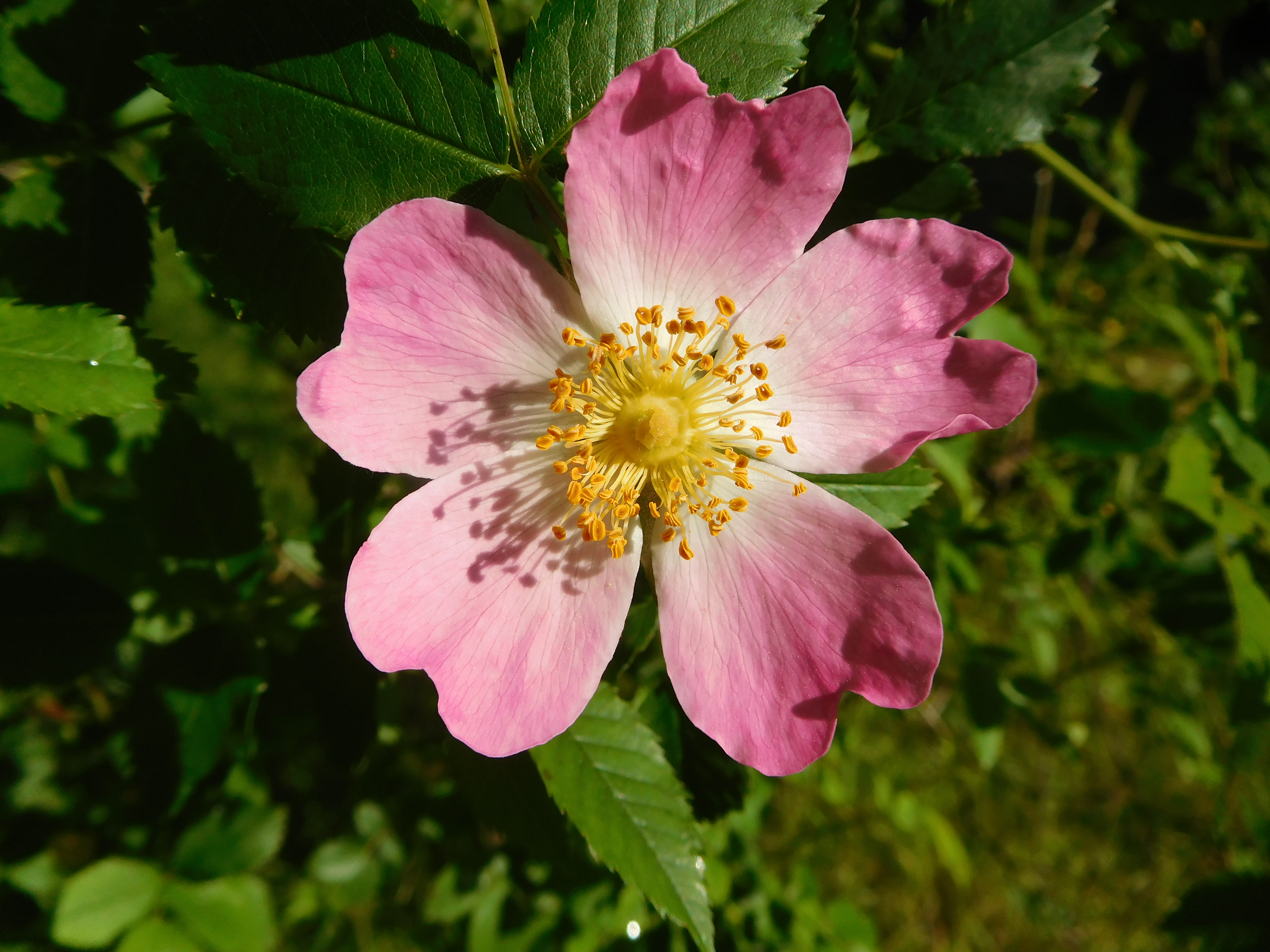
Dog rose, Rosa canina

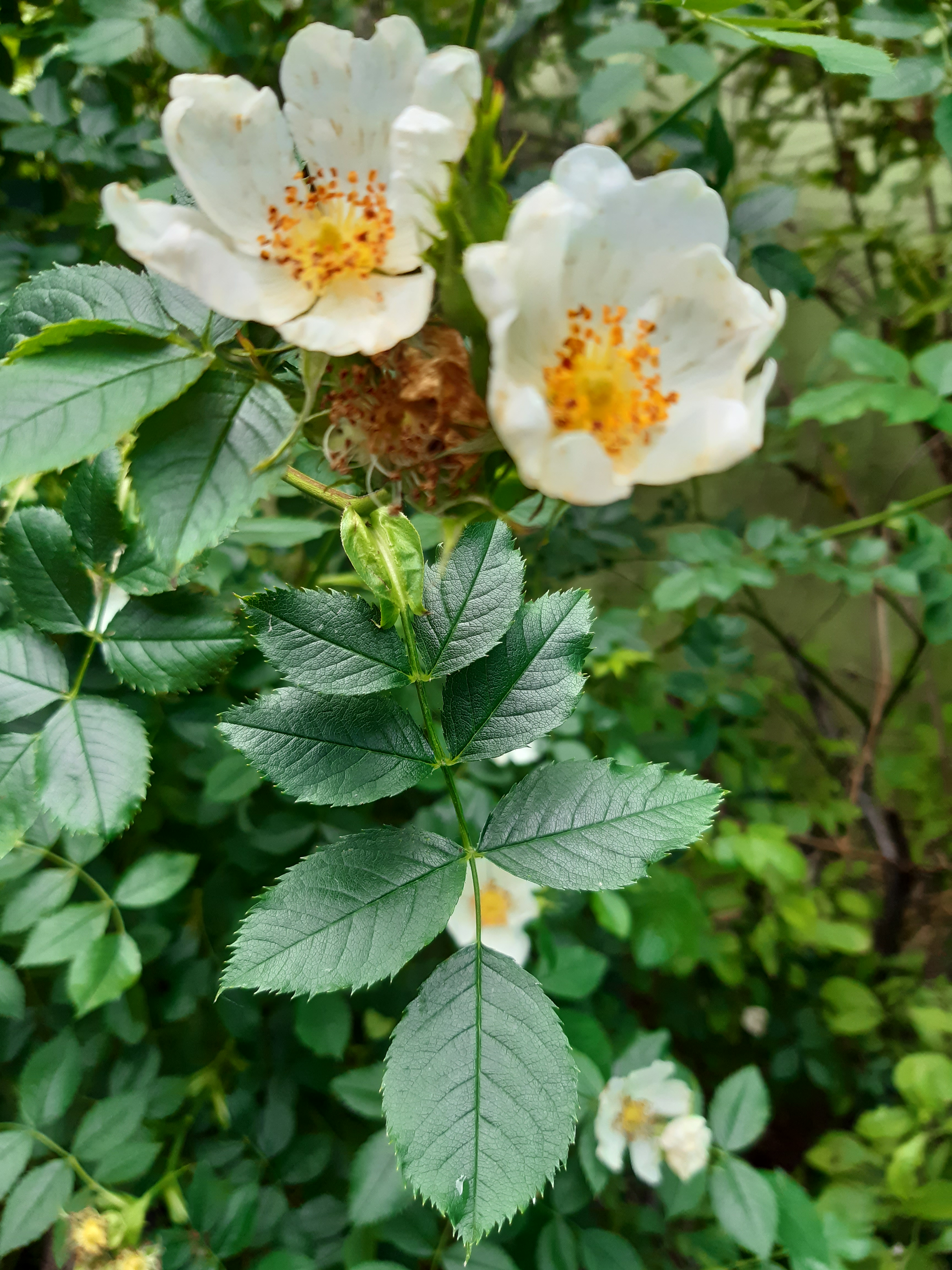
Field rose, Rosa arvensis, by car park

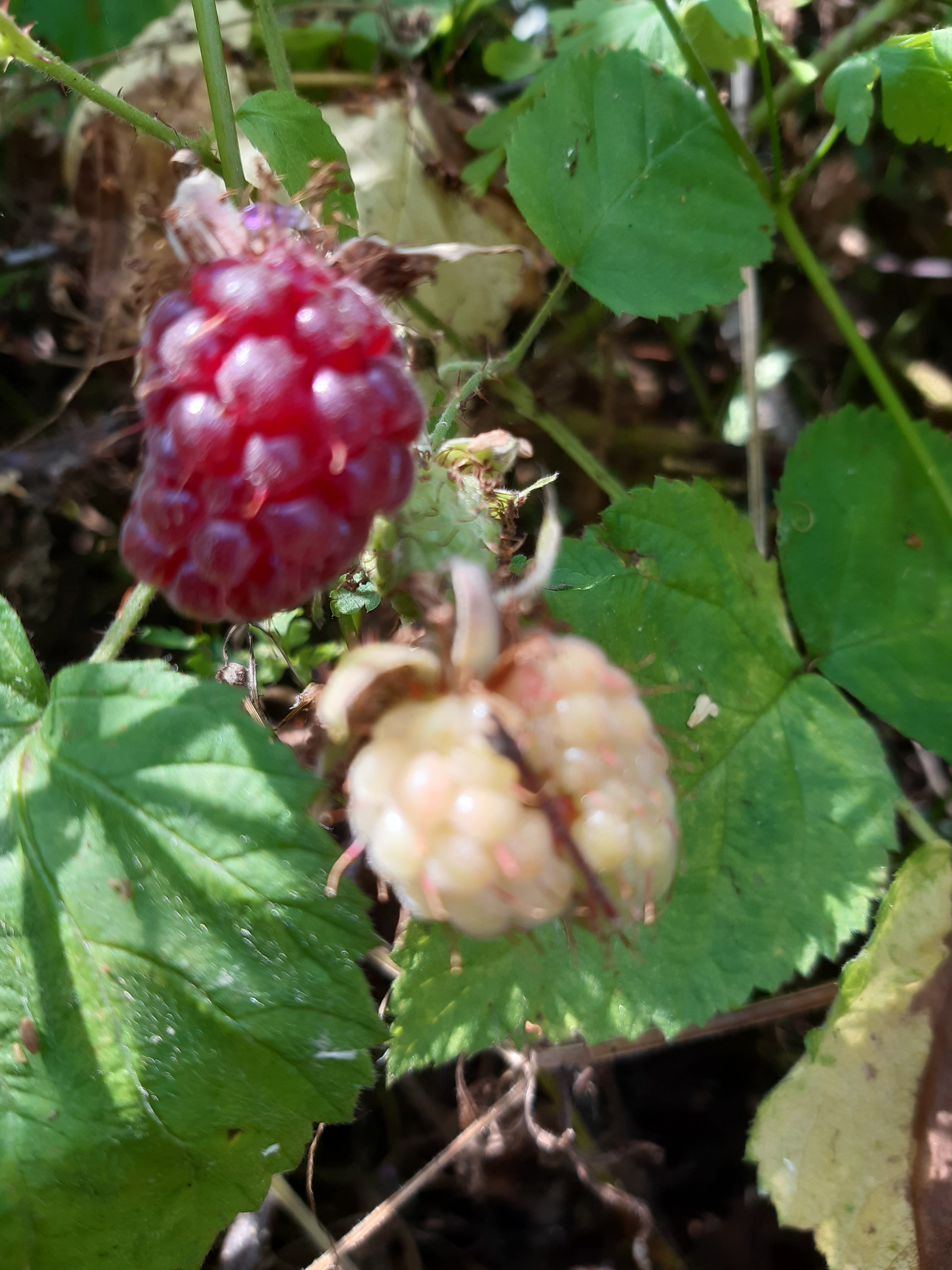
Raspberry, Rubus idaeus

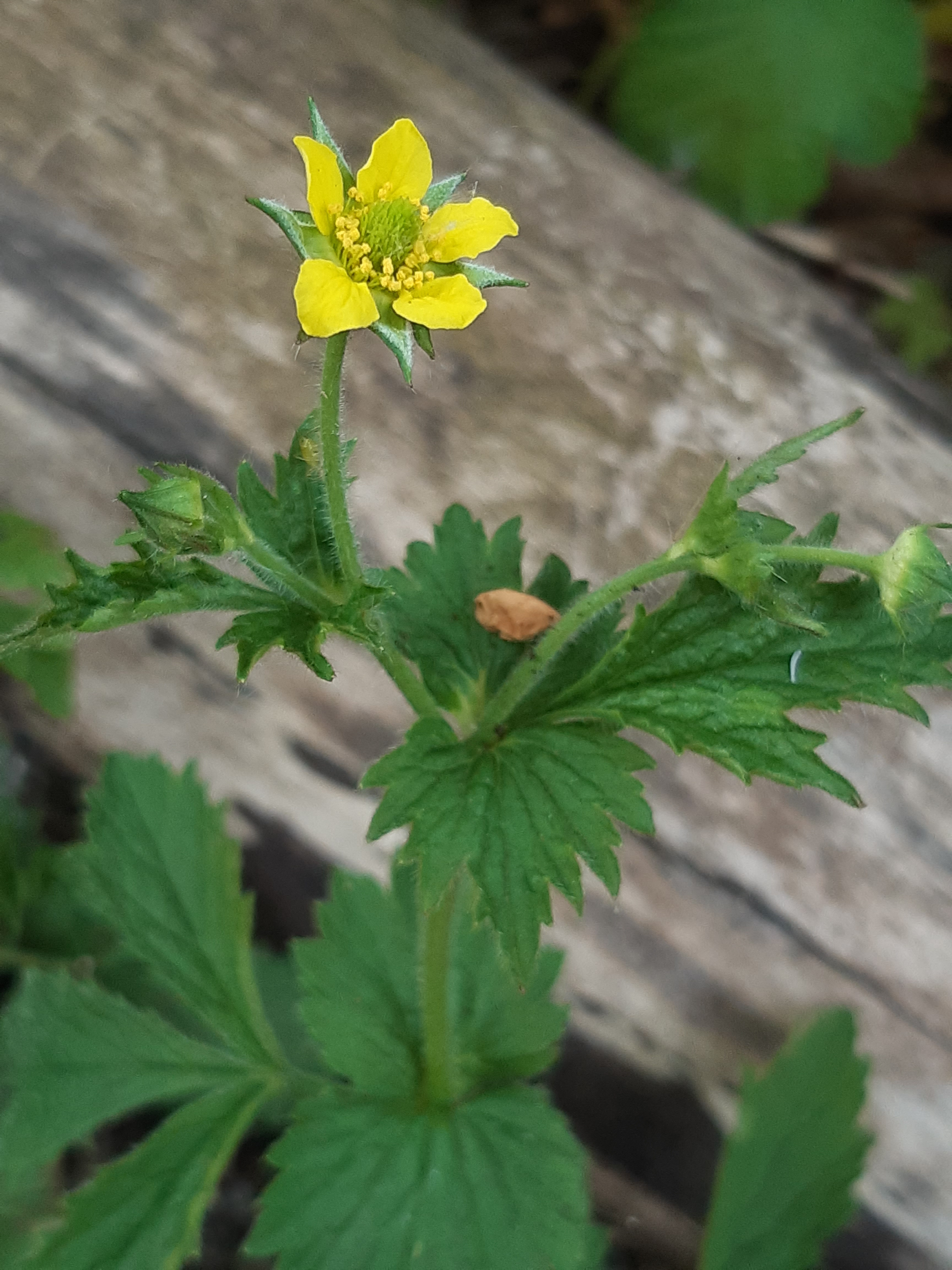
Herb Bennet, Geum urbanum by woodland path edges

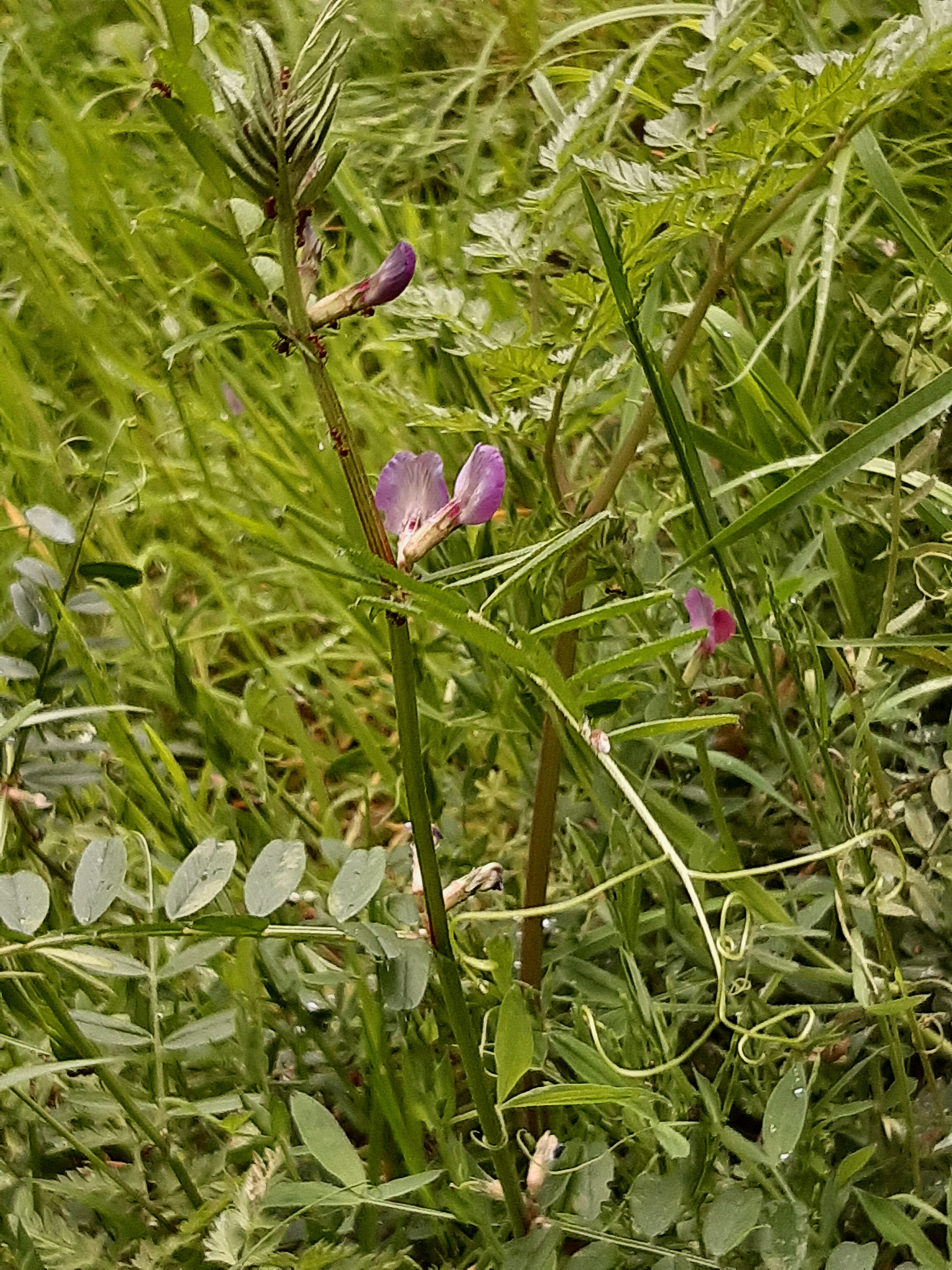
Common vetch, Vicia sativa, in de-brambled anthill meadow

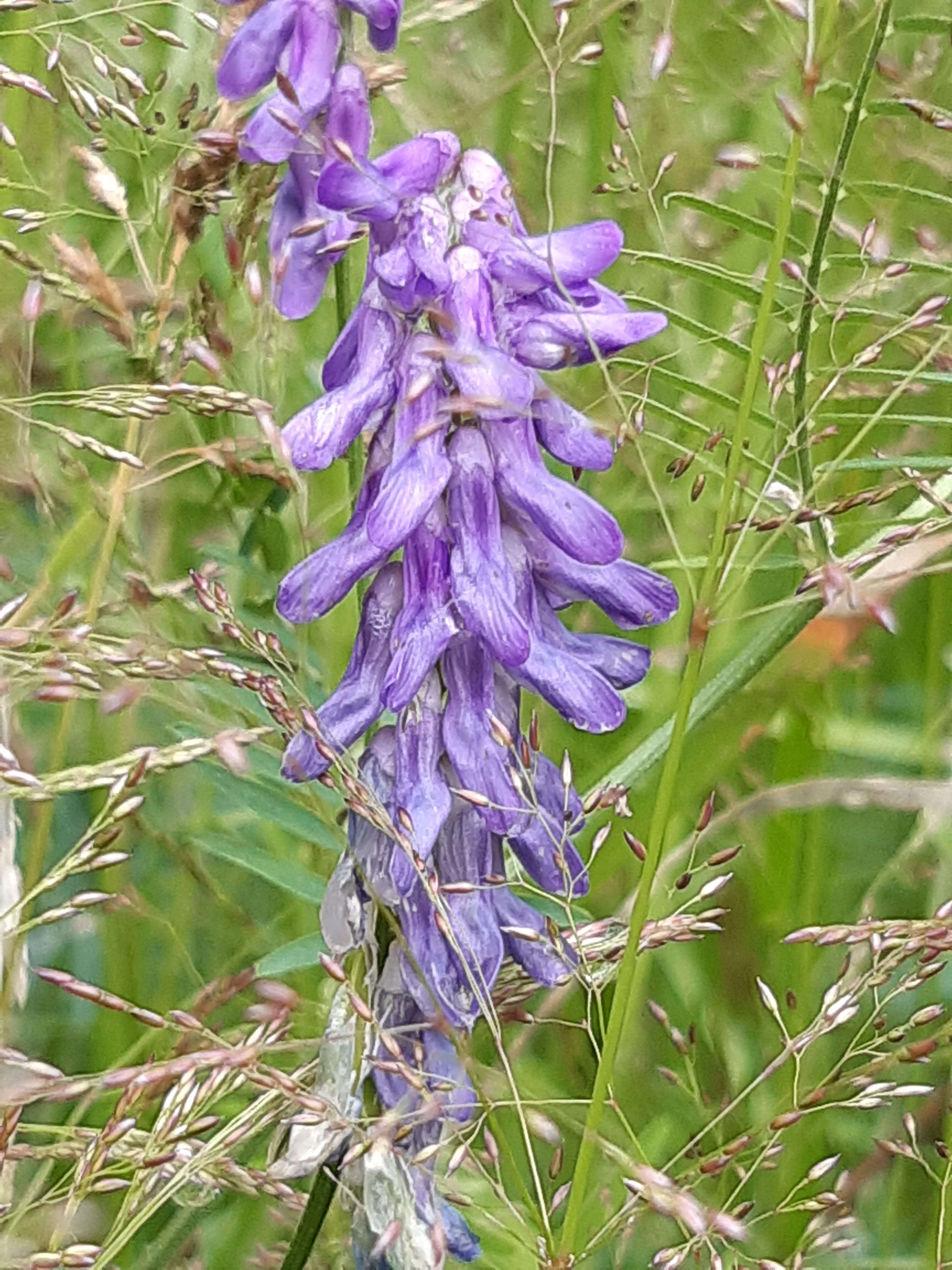
Tufted Vetch, Vicia cracca, in anthill meadow

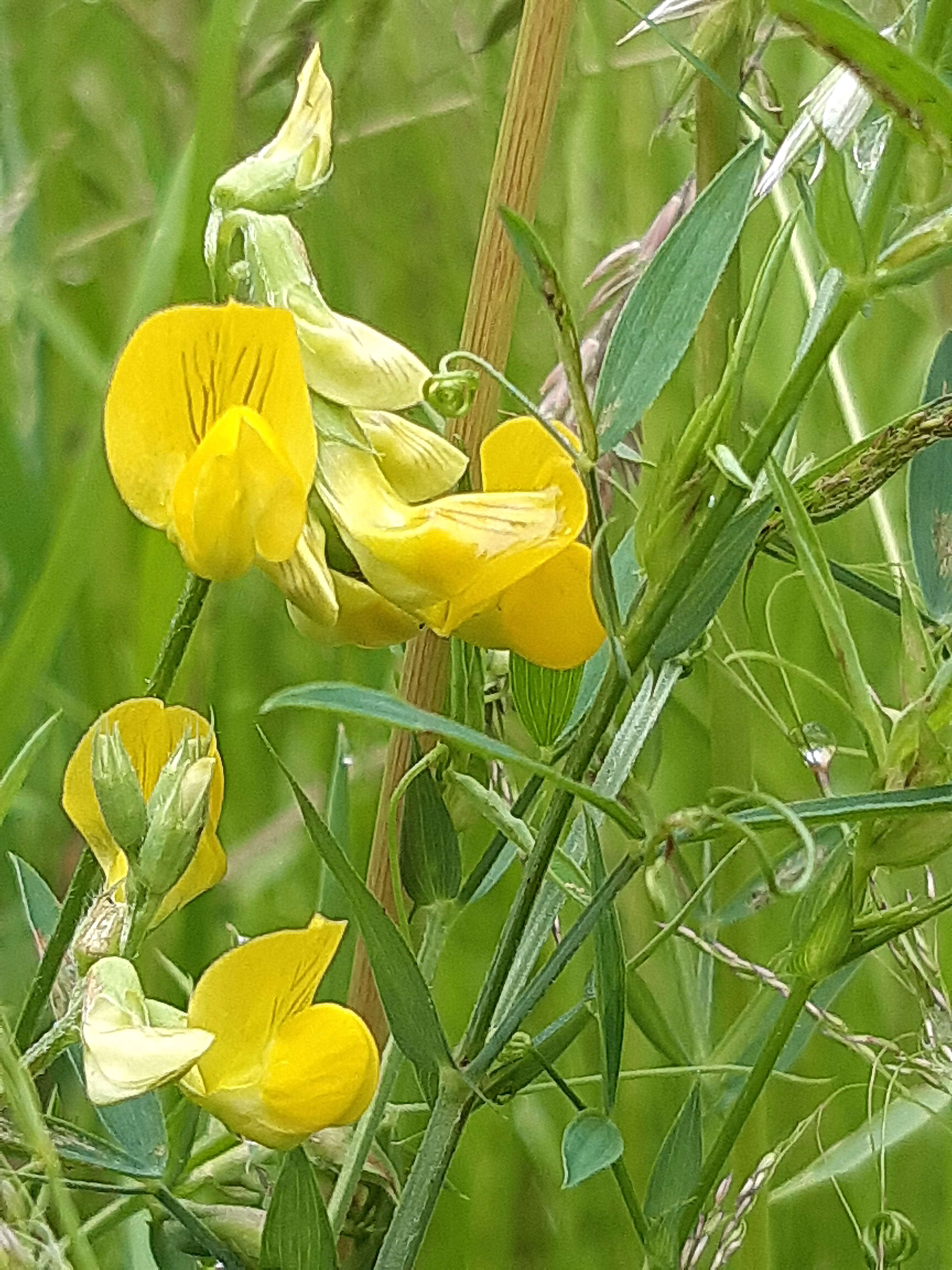
Meadow Vetchling, Lathyrus pratensis, in anthill meadow

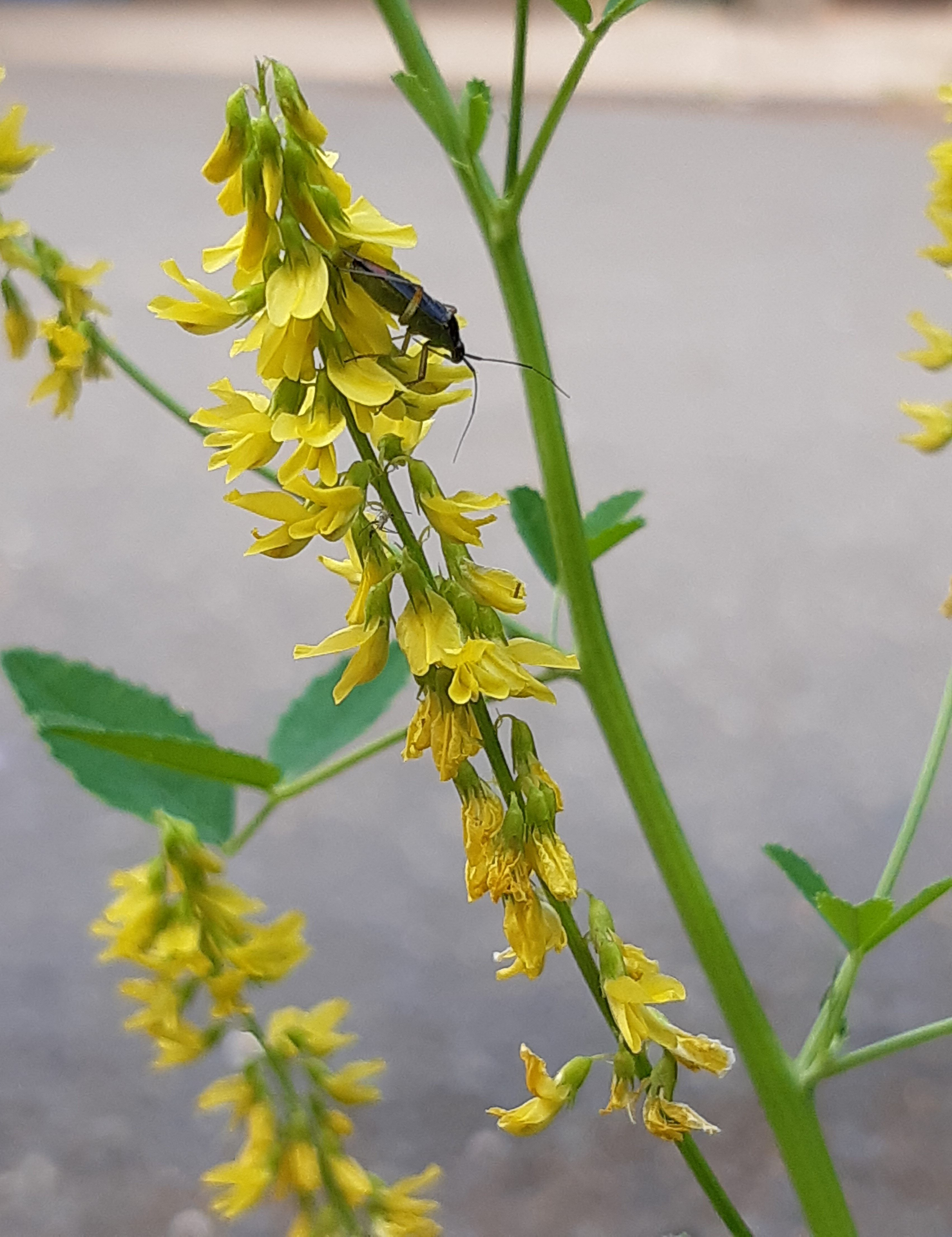
Ribbed melilot, Melilotus officinalis, by car park

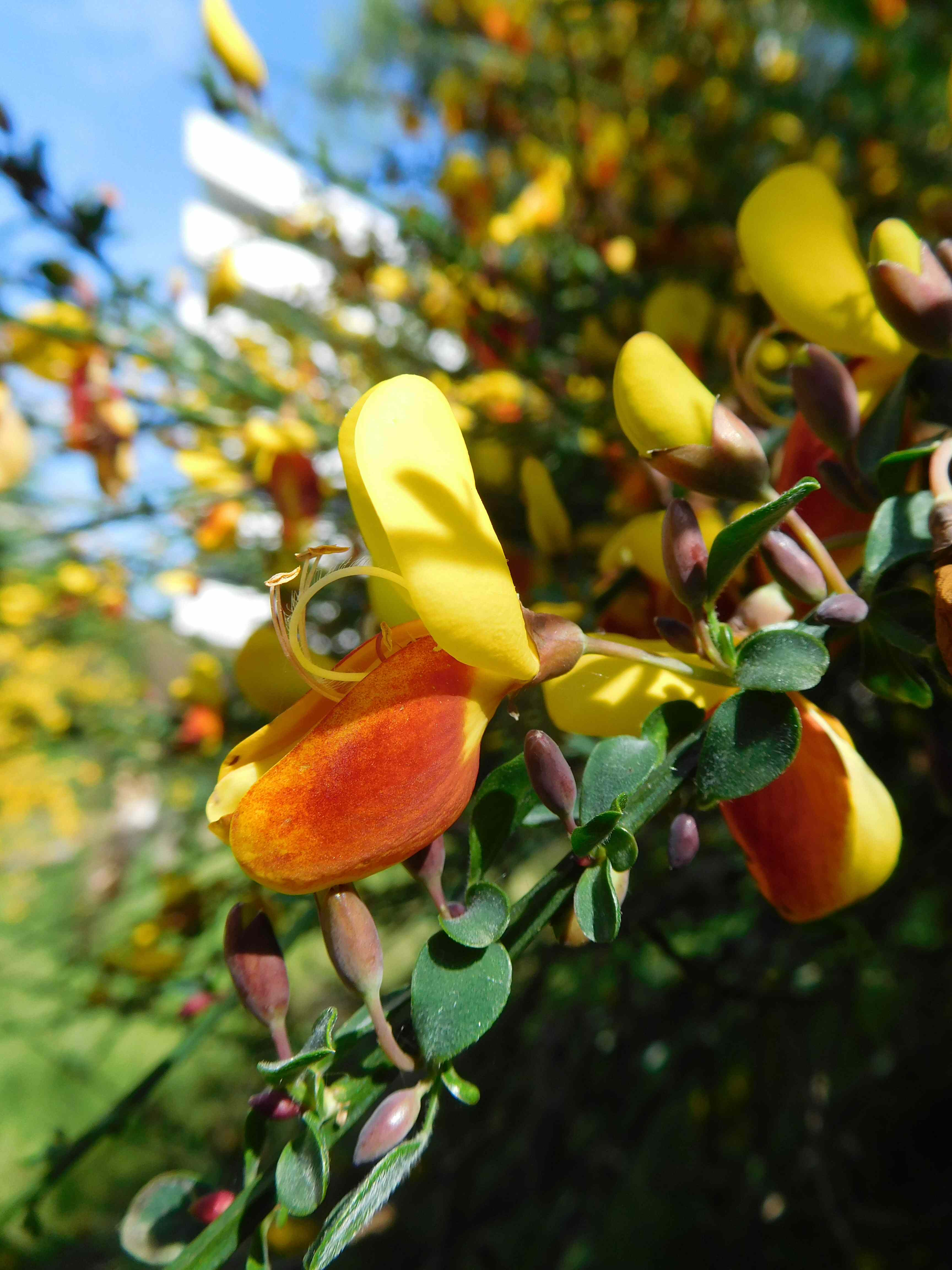
Broom, Cytisus scoparius variety, naturalised

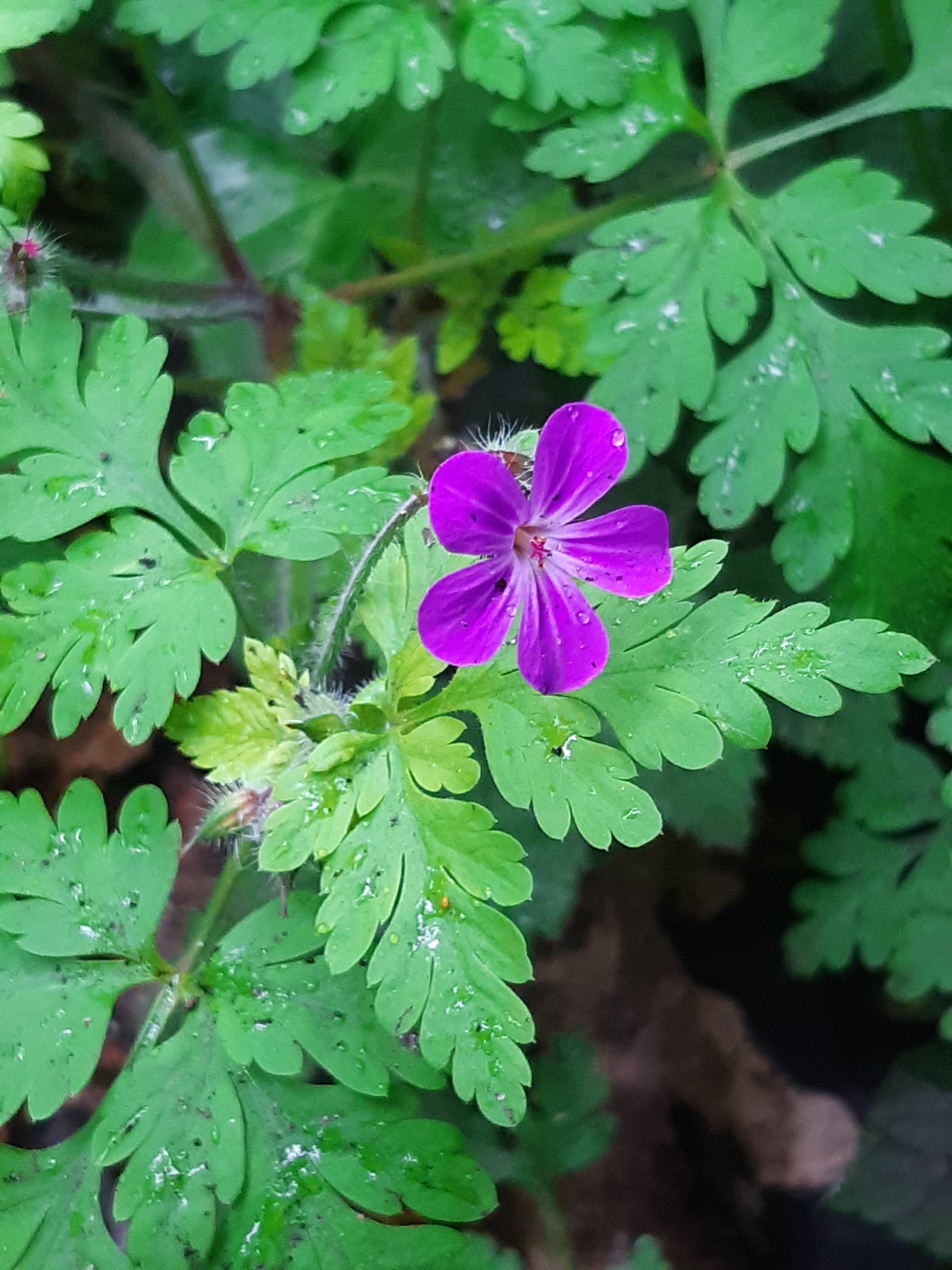
Herb Robert, Geranium robertianum under trees

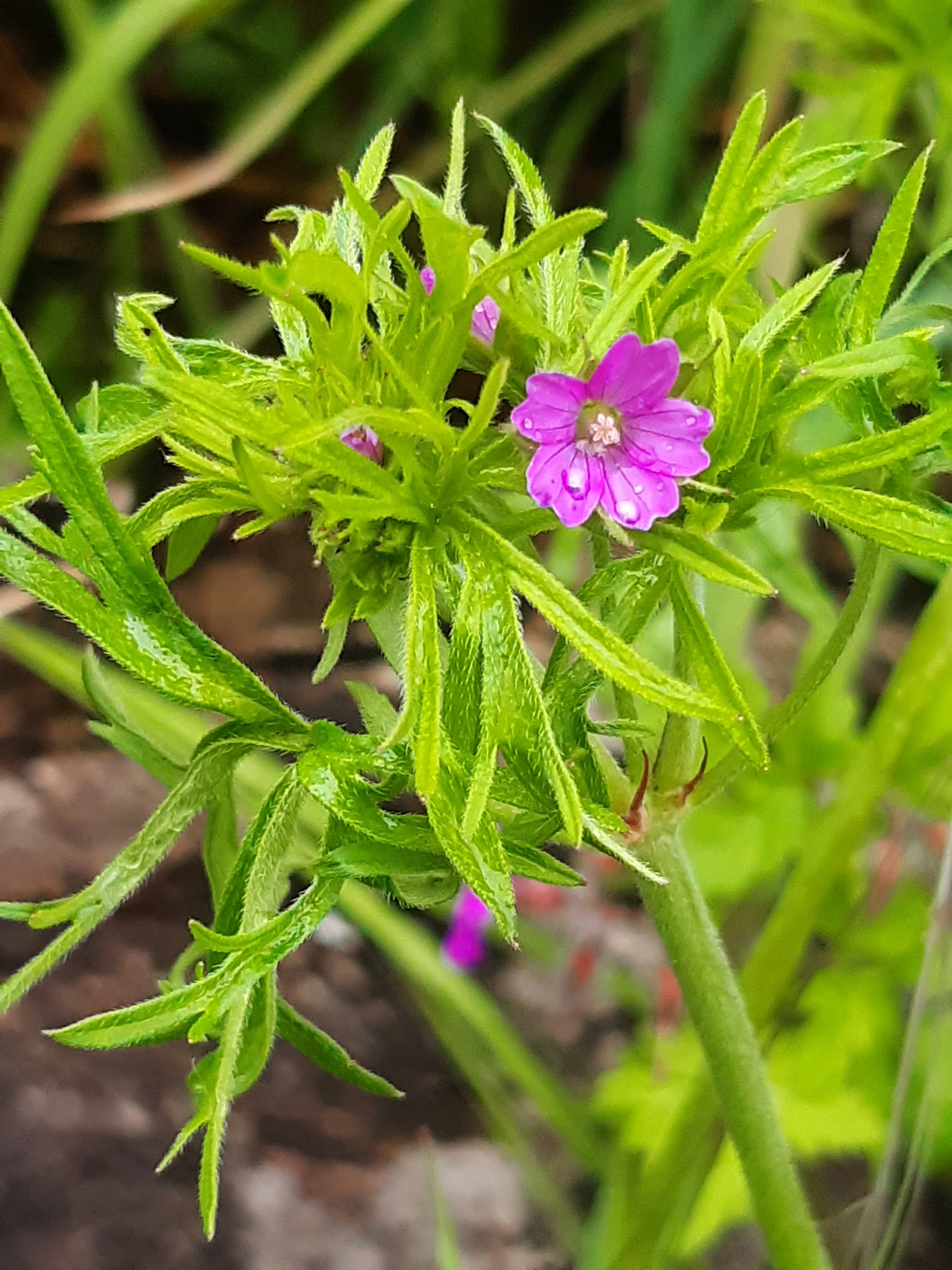
Cut-leaved cranesbill, Geranium dissectum, on old railway track

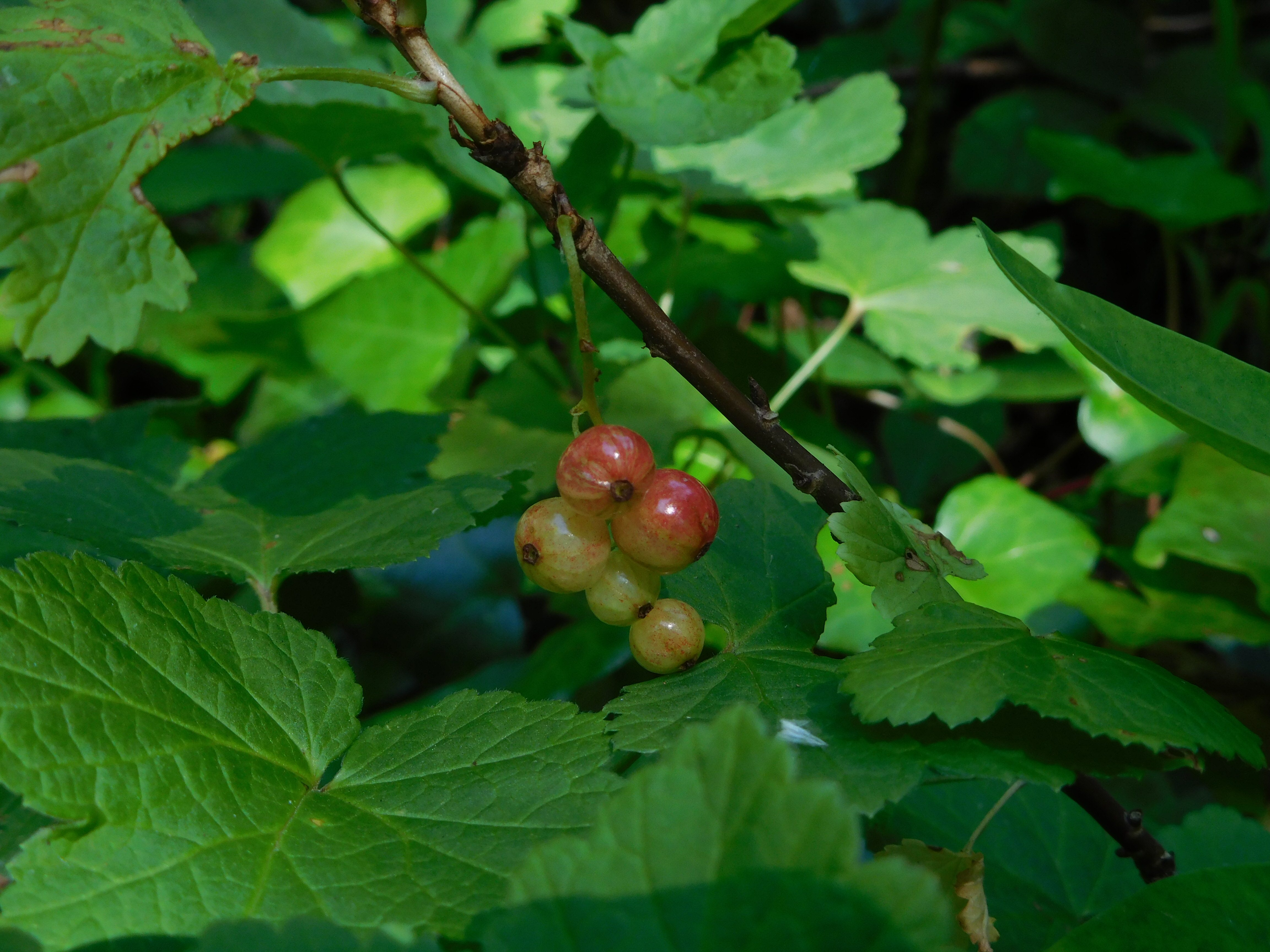
Redcurrant, Ribes rubrum, from the railwaymen's gardens that were once here

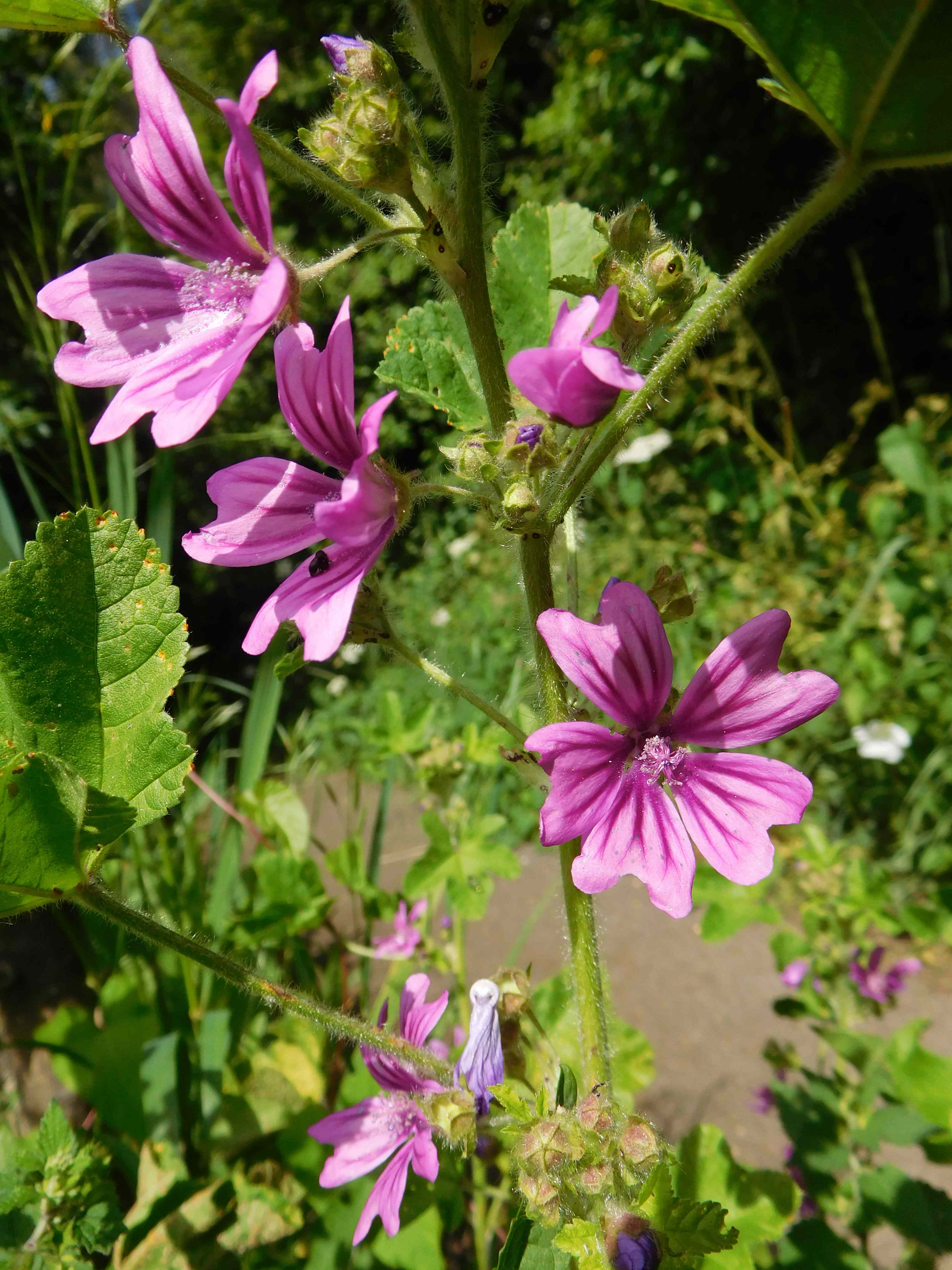
Mallow, Malva sylvestris, by ramp meadow

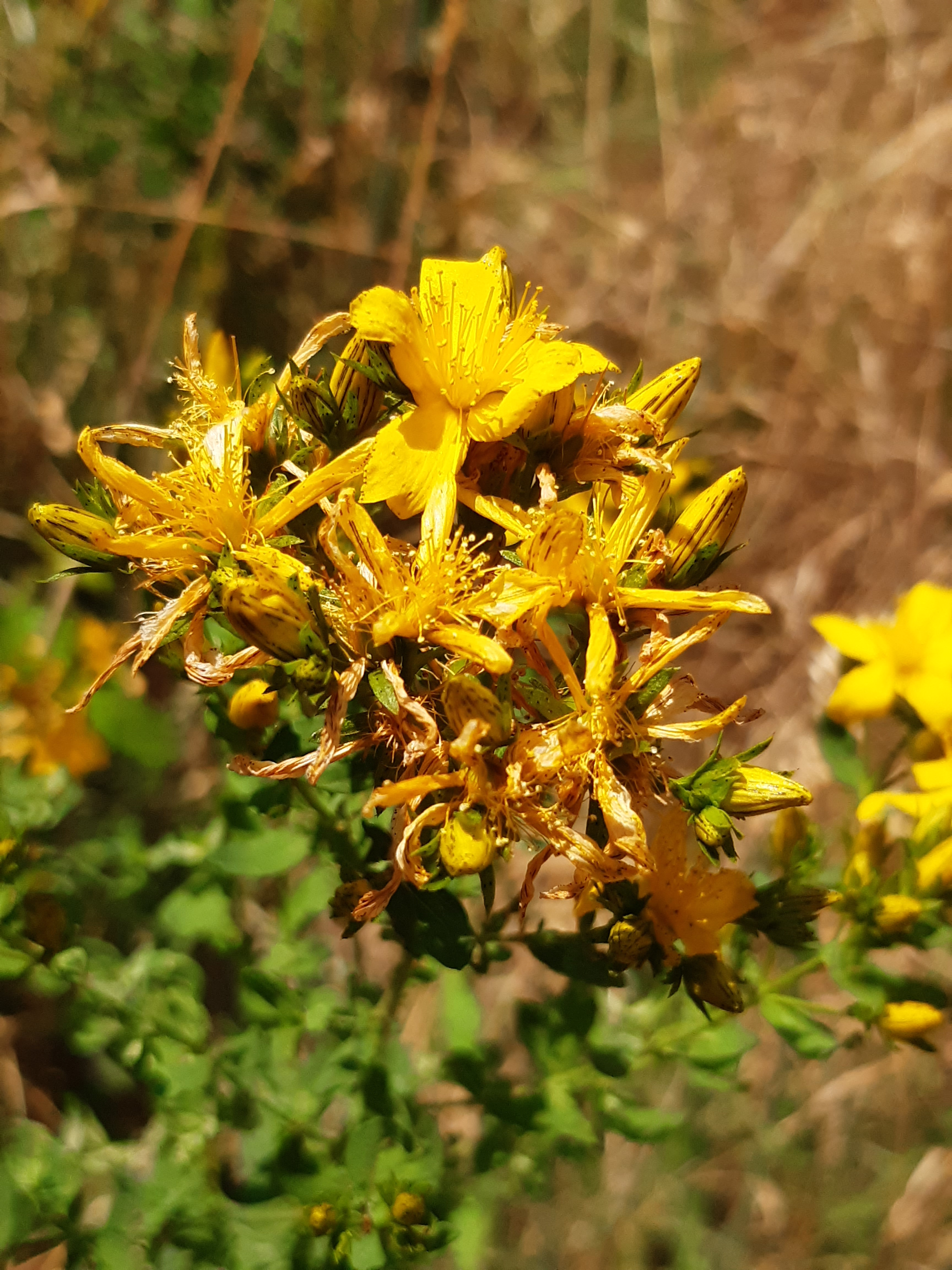
St John's wort, Hypericum perforatum, on North Bank

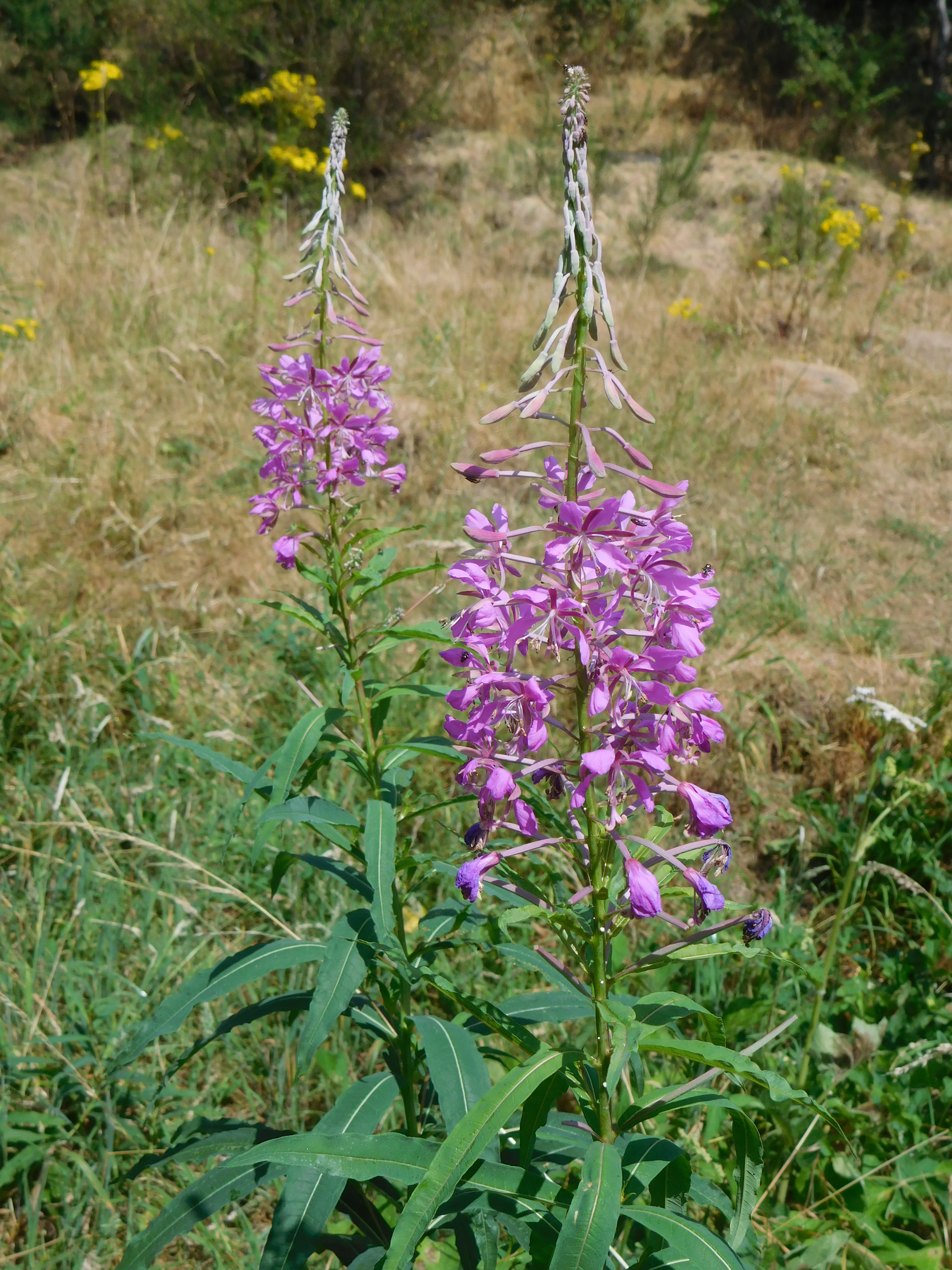
Rosebay willowherb, Chamaenerion angustifolium, in the anthill meadow

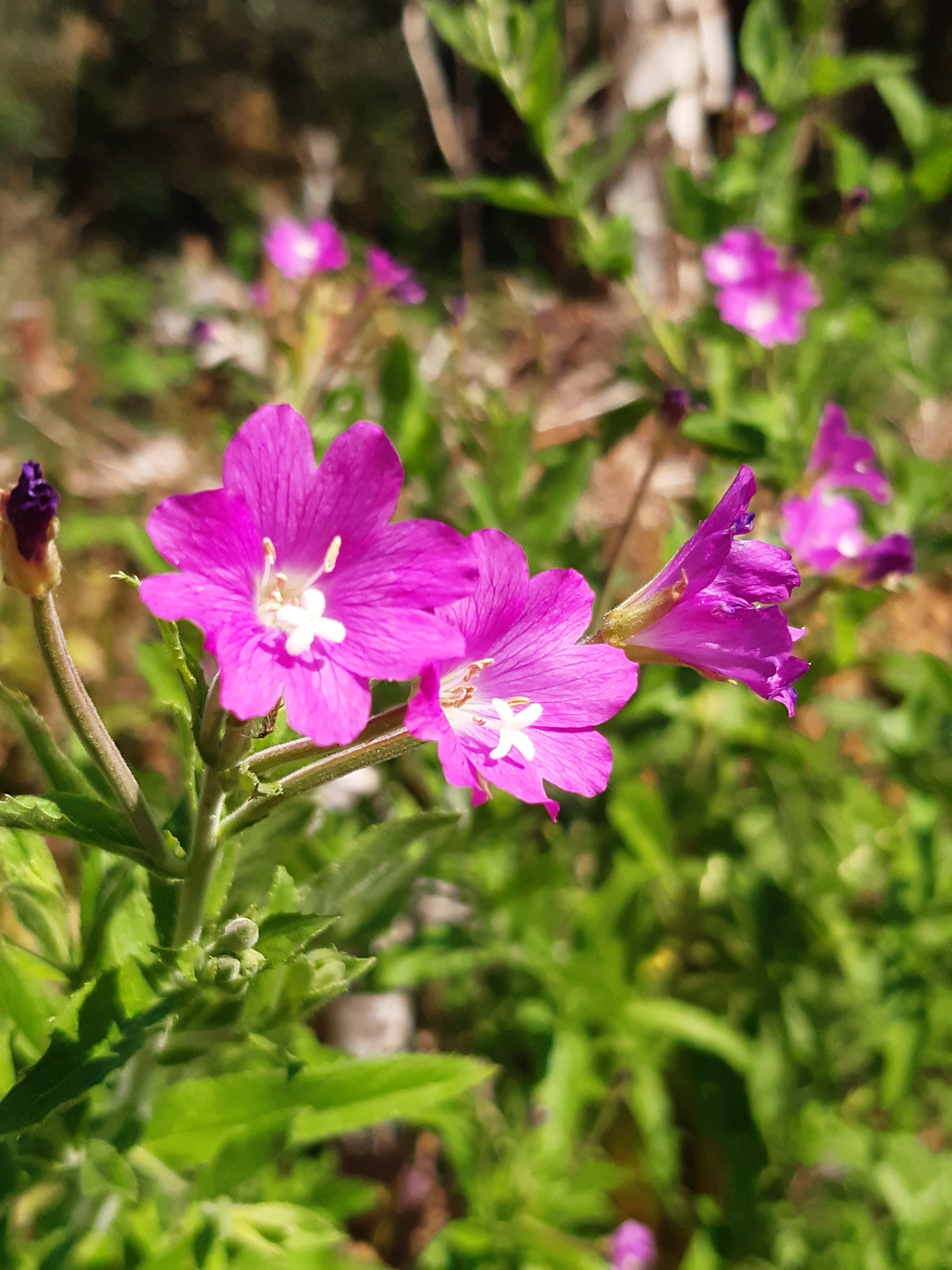
Great willowherb, Epilobium hirsutum, by main pond

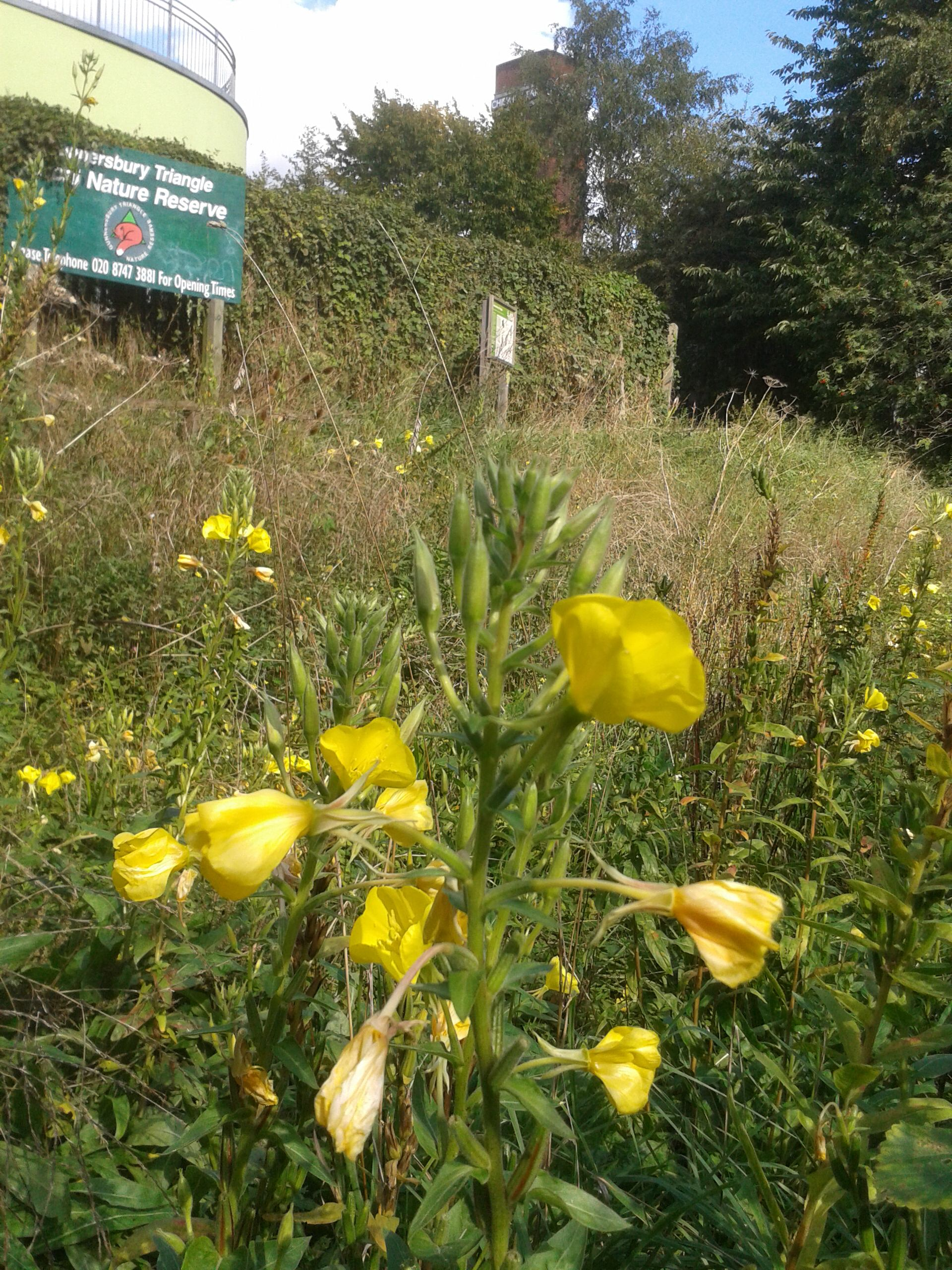
Evening primroses (Oenothera) on the ramp meadow

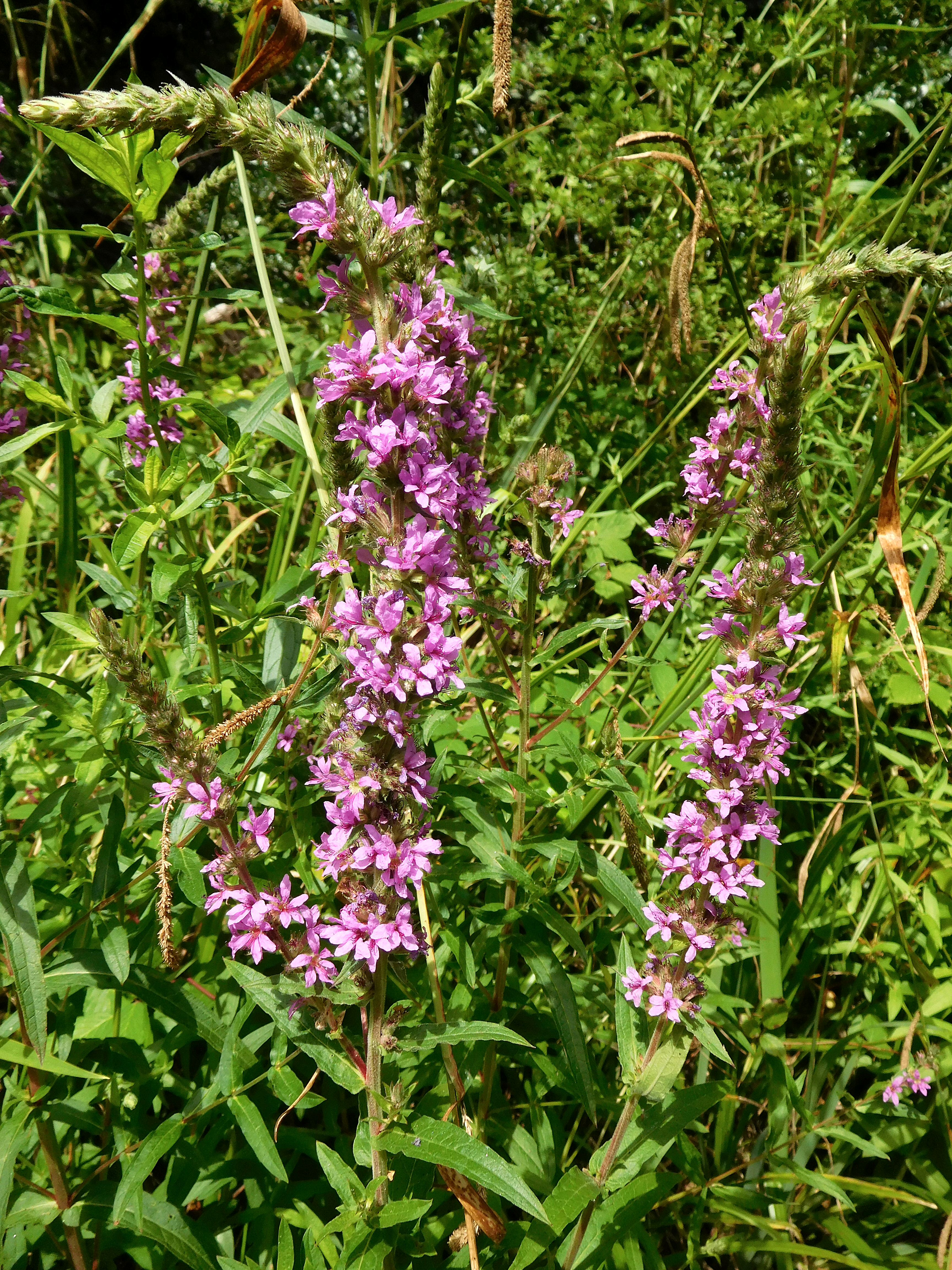
Purple loosestrife, Lythrum salicaria

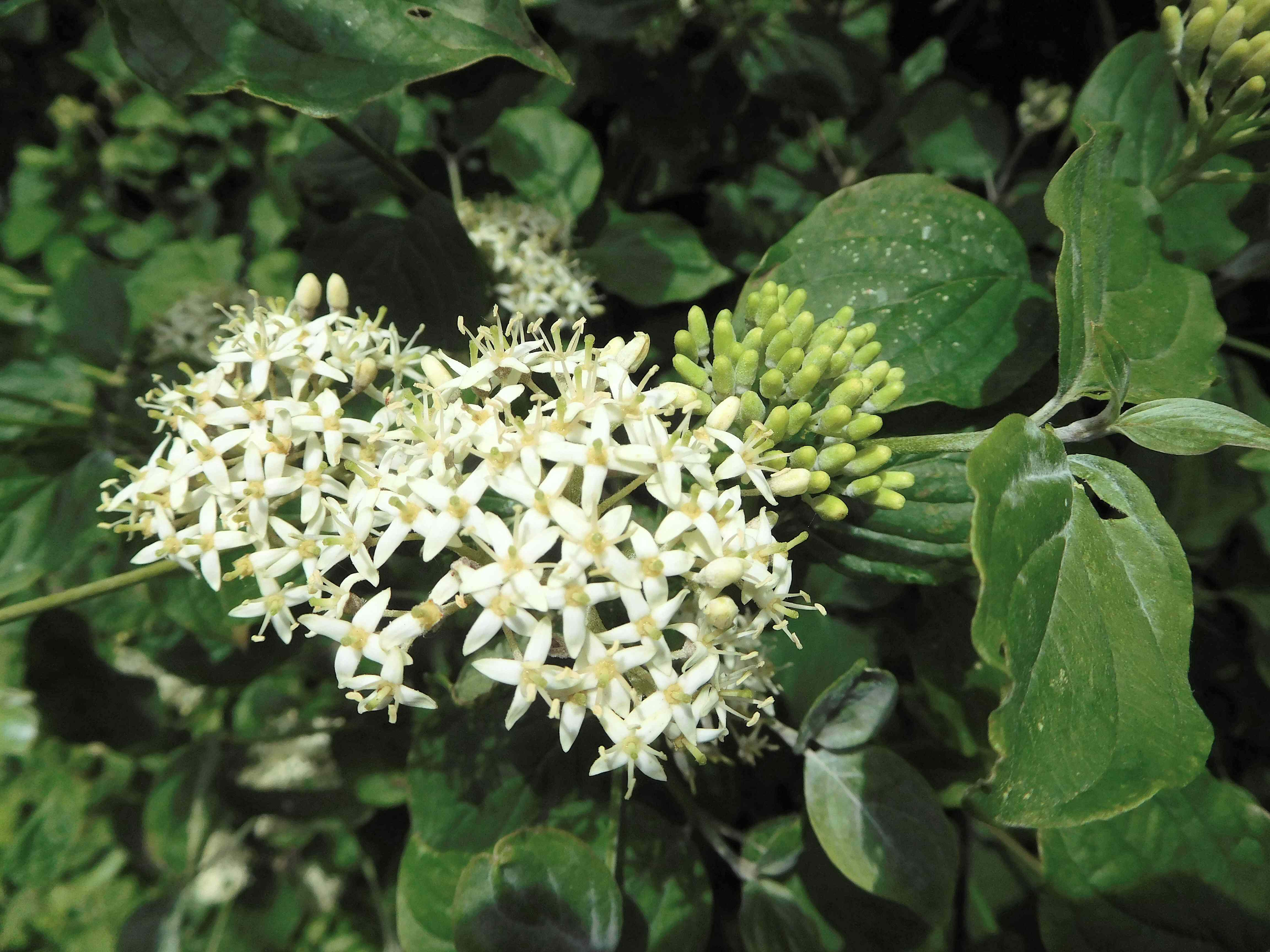
Dogwood, Cornus sanguinea, in flower in the front hedge

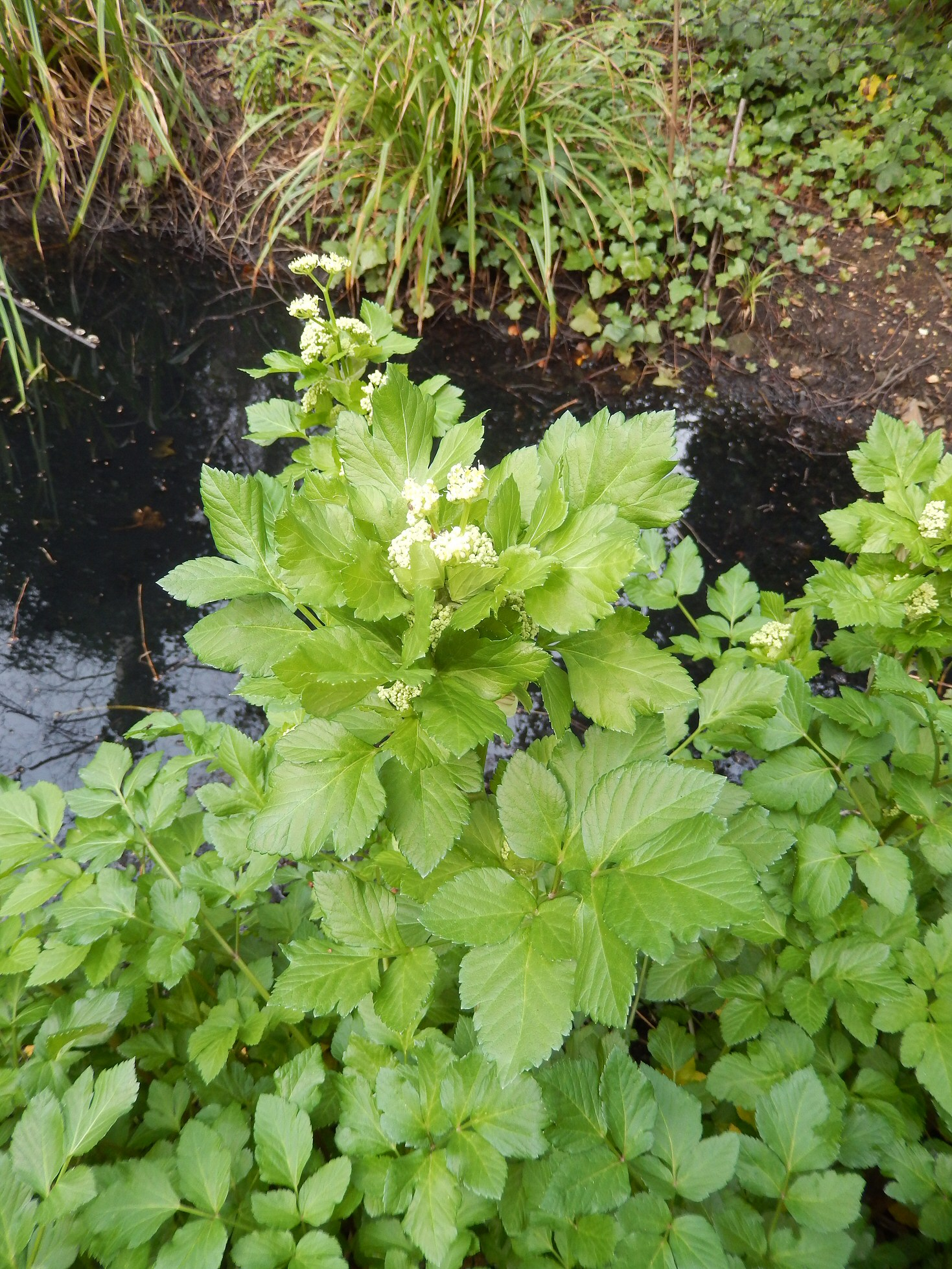
Alexanders, Smyrnium olusatrum, growing by a seasonal pond

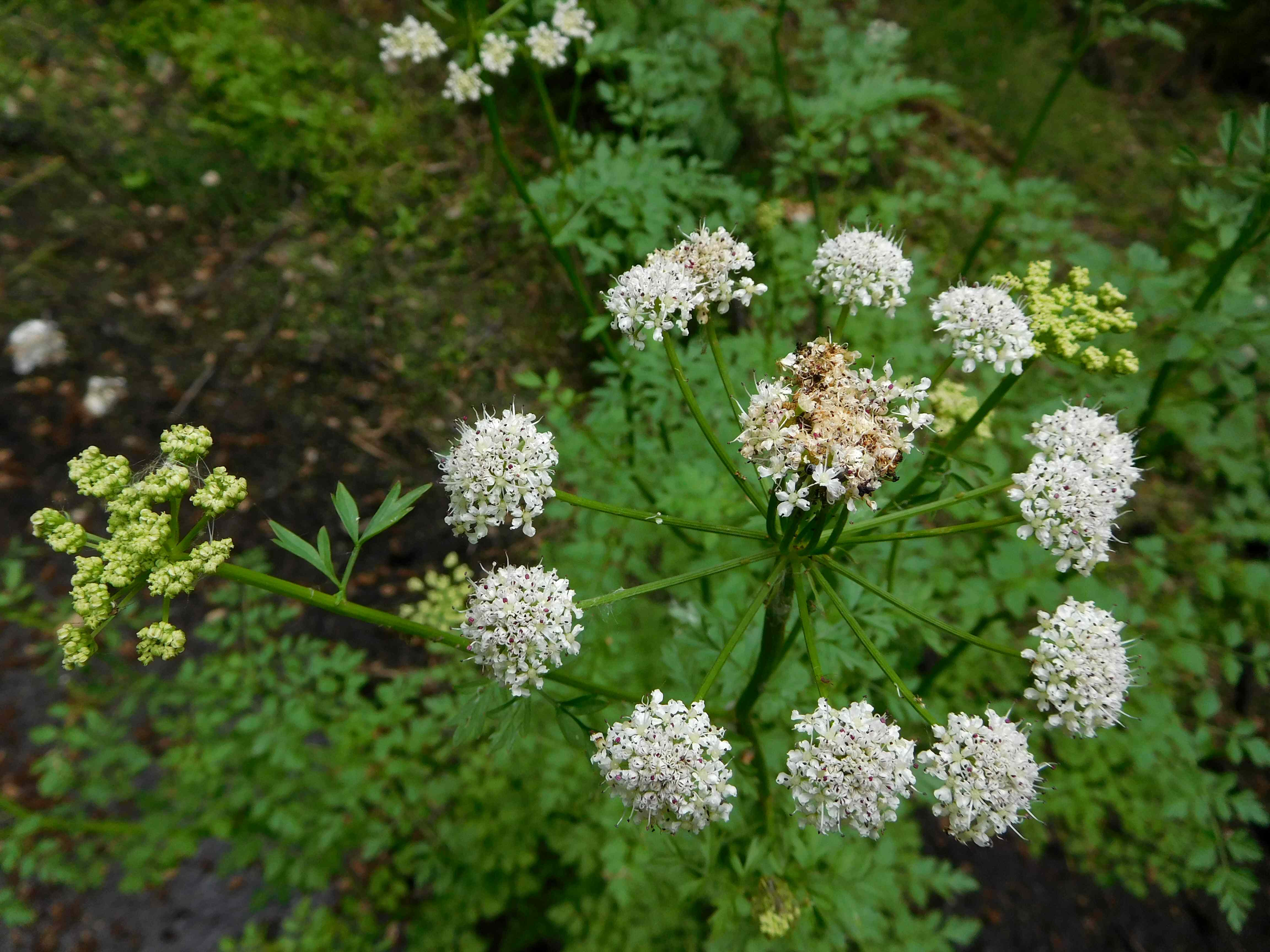
Hemlock water-dropwort, Oenanthe crocata in wet woodland

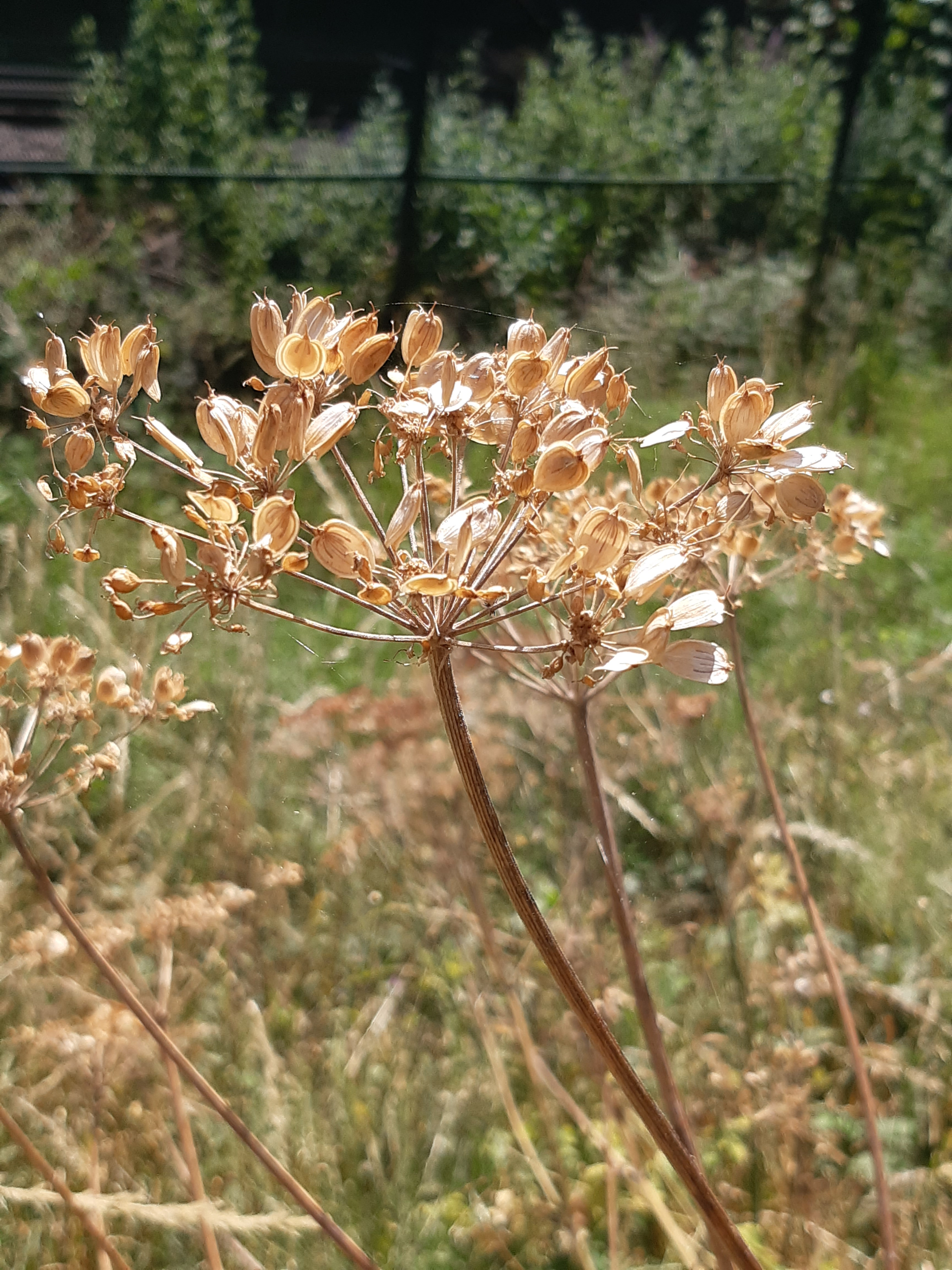
Hogweed, Heracleum sphondylium, in fruit in Ramp Meadow

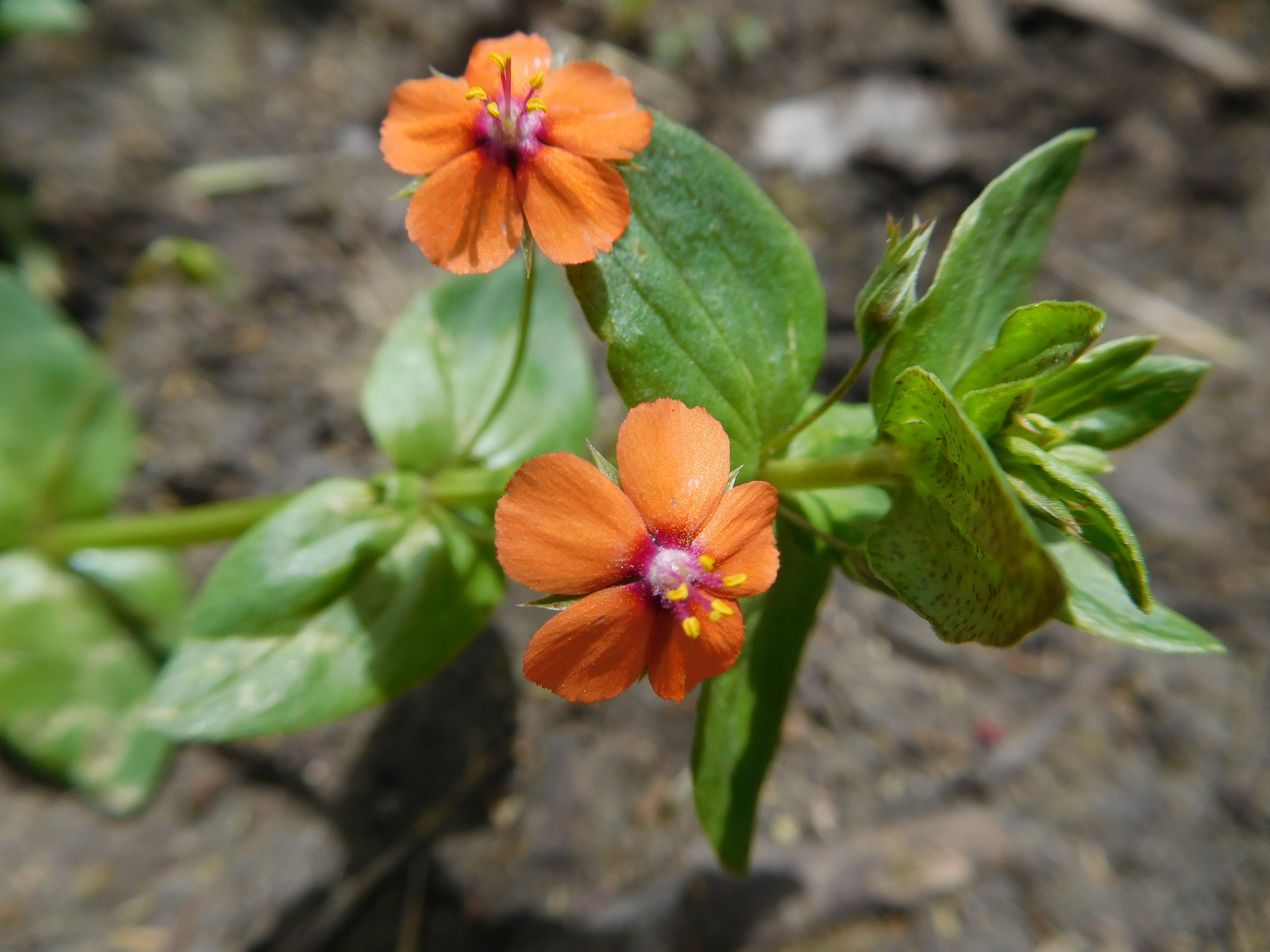
Scarlet pimpernel, Anagallis arvensis, on bare ground disturbed by hedge-laying

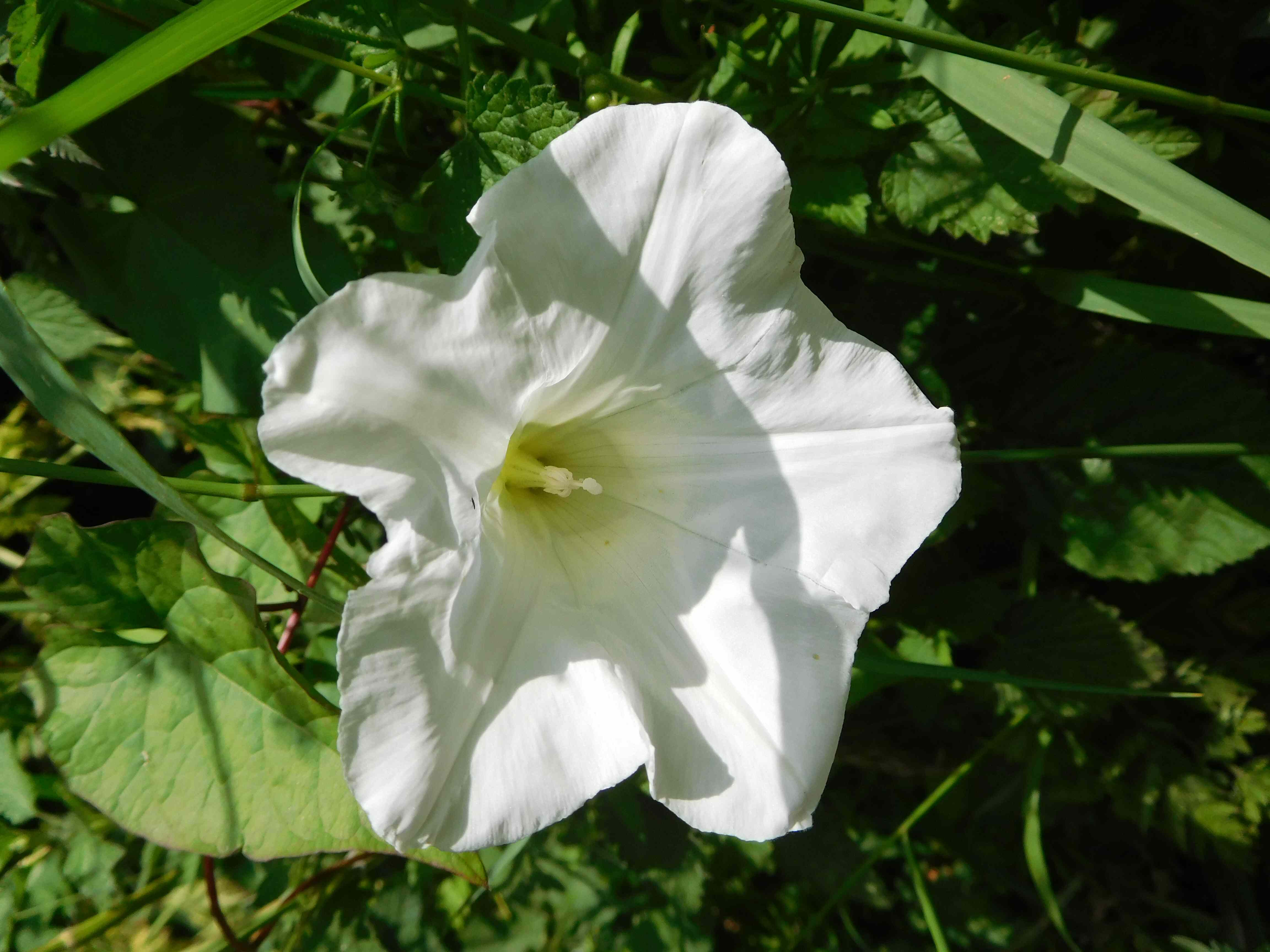
Bindweed, Calystegia sepium, by ramp meadow

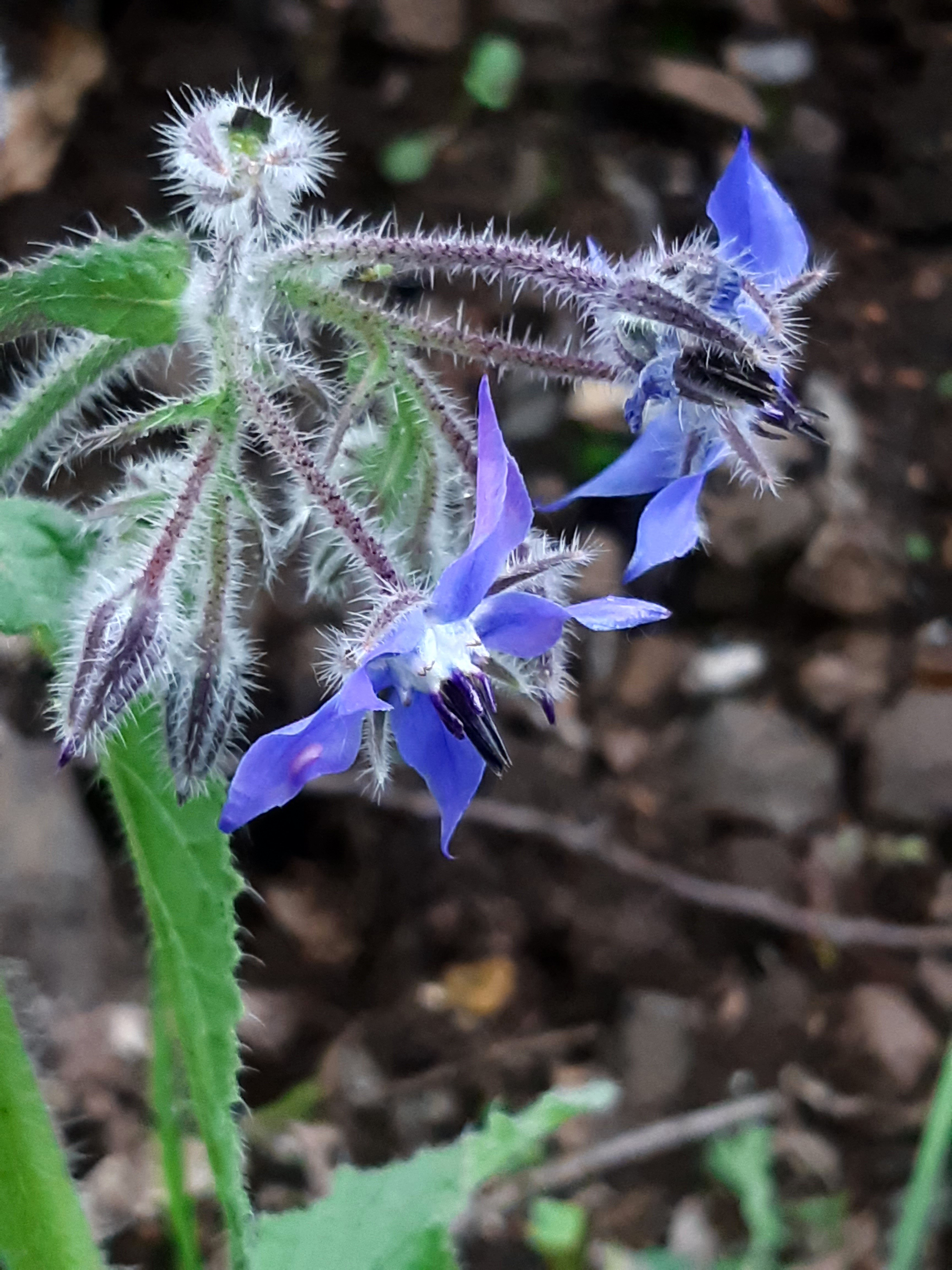
Borage, Borago officinalis, on cleared ground behind anthill meadow

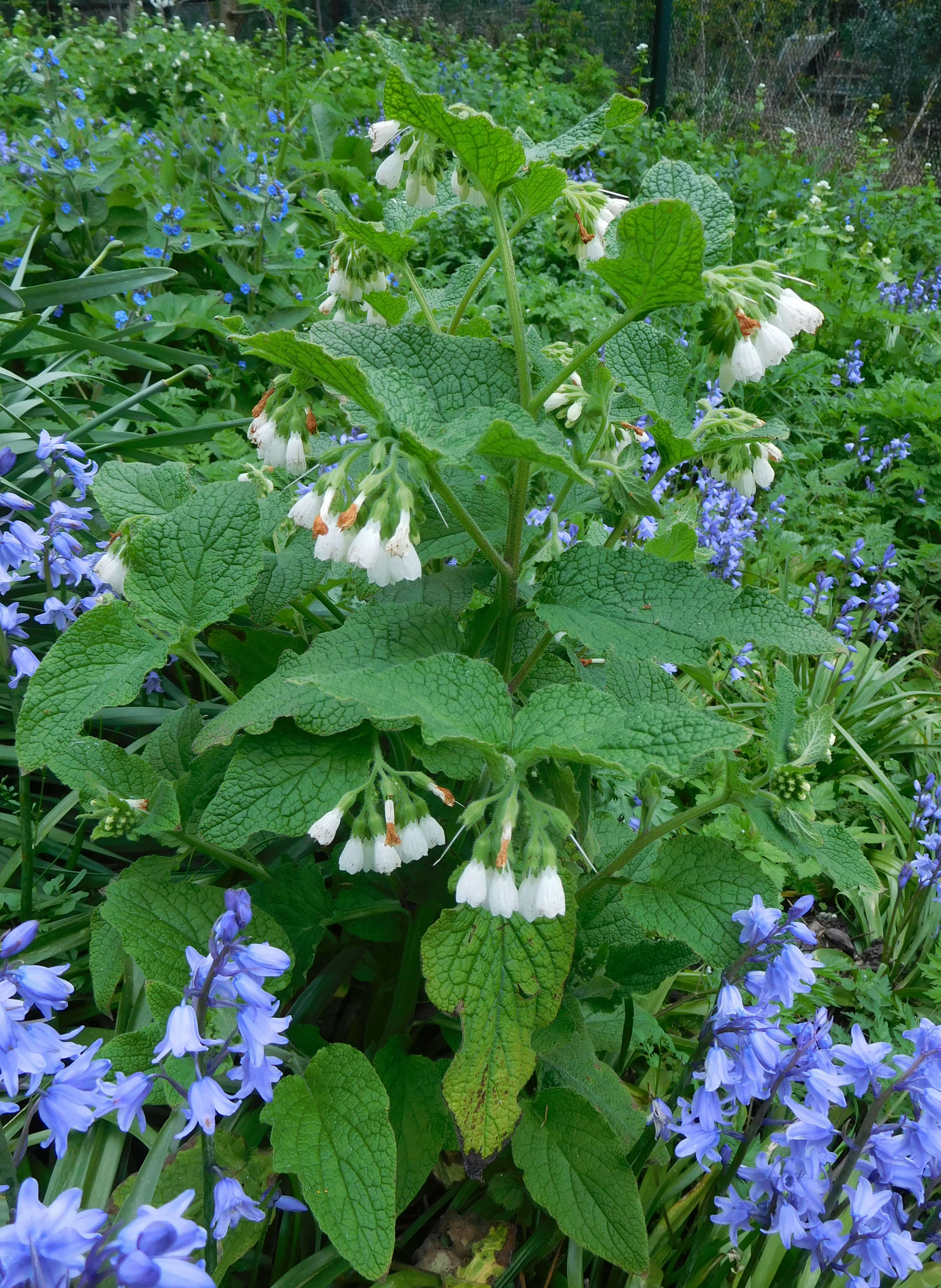
Comfrey, Symphytum officinale, on ramp

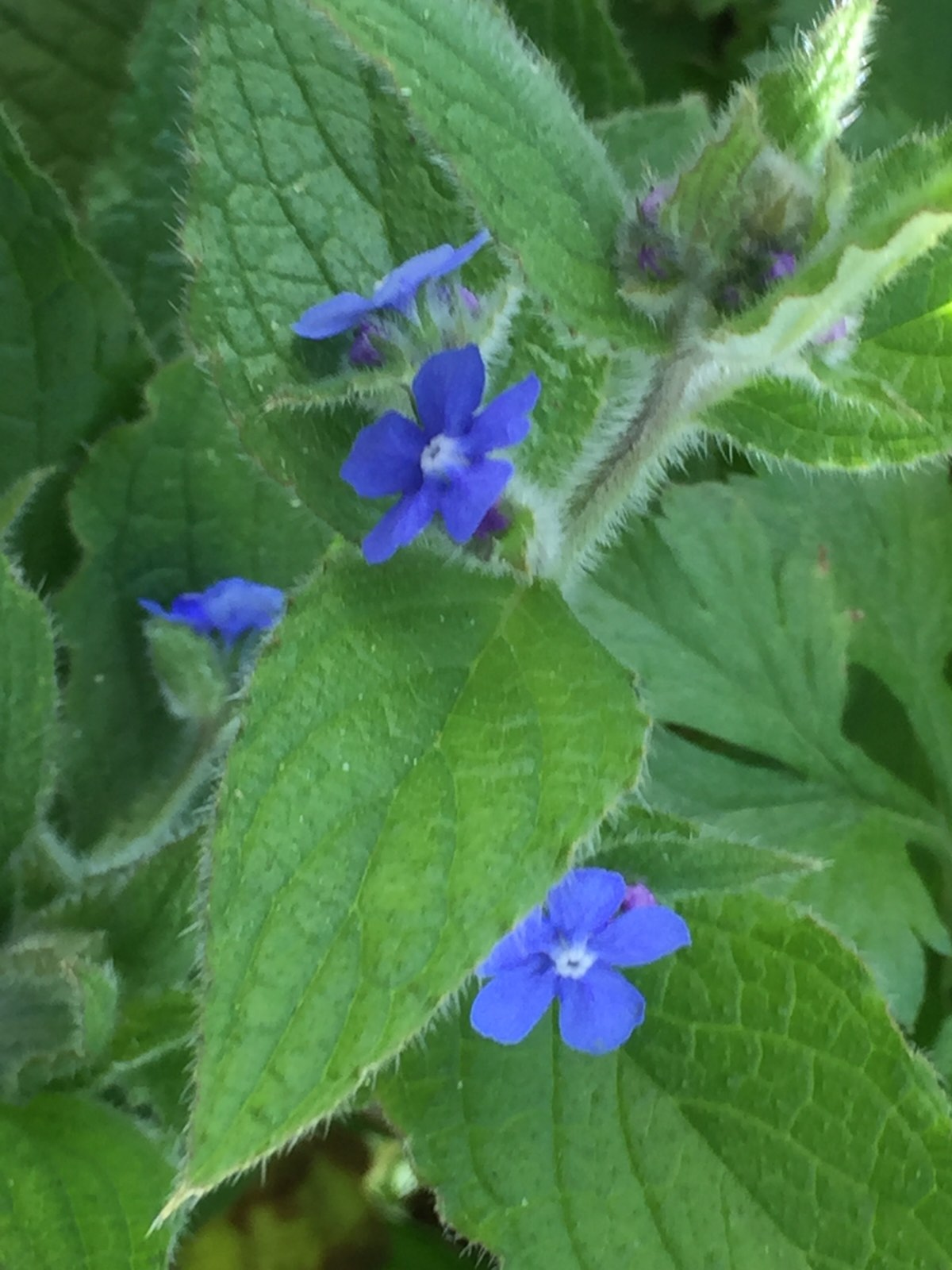
Green alkanet, Pentaglottis sempervirens

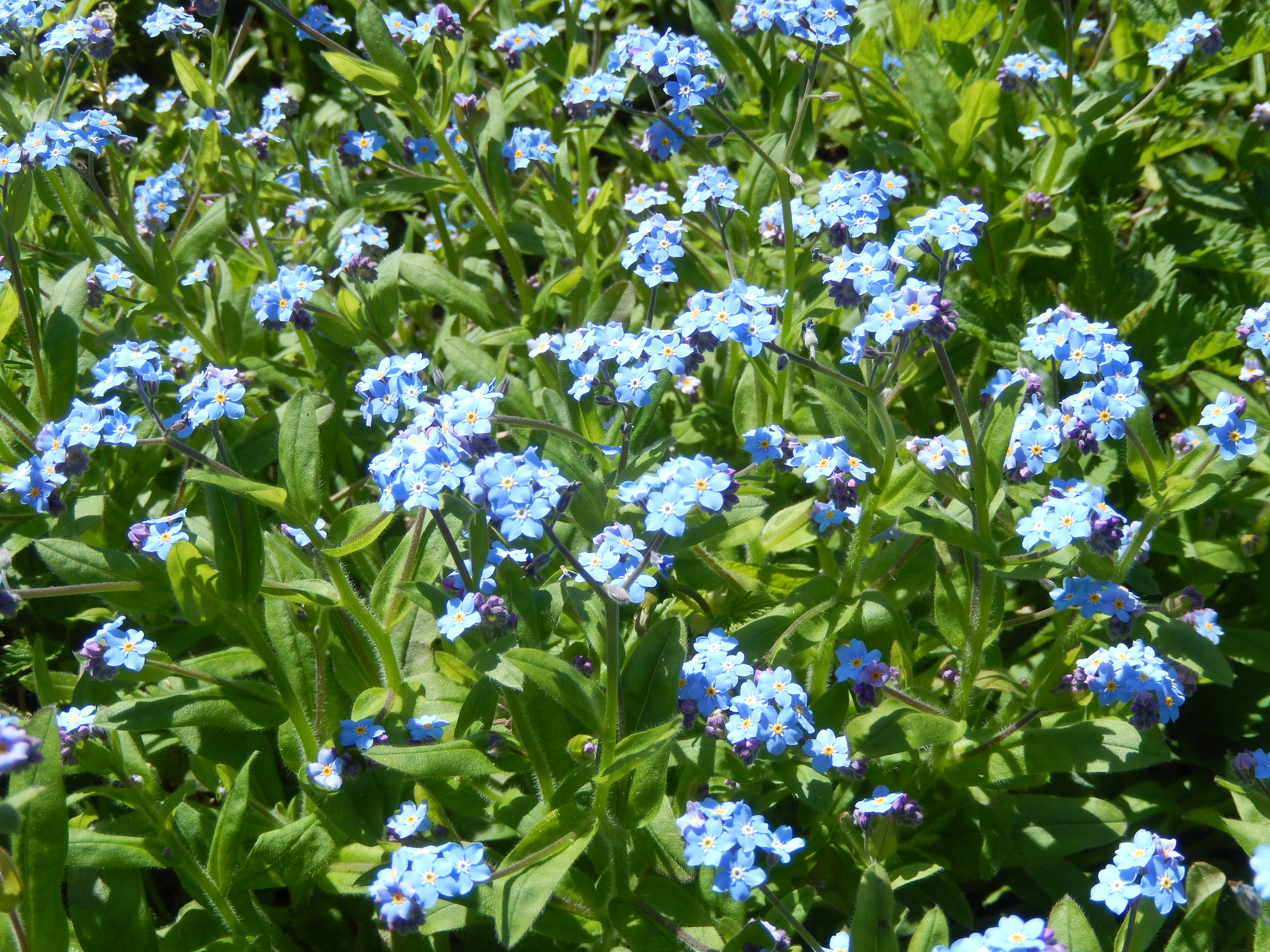
Spring show of forget-me-nots, Myosotis arvensis

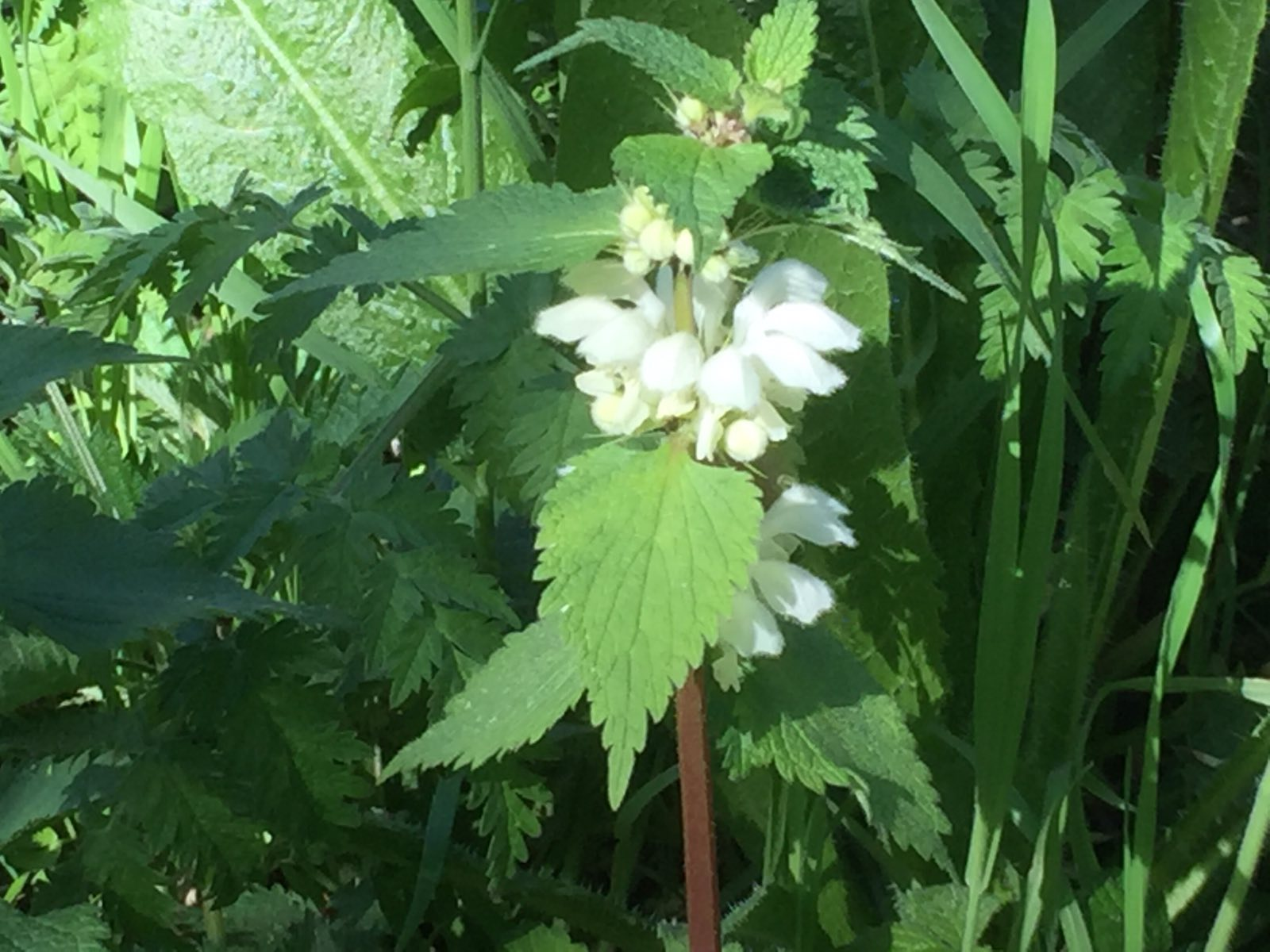
White dead-nettle, Lamium album

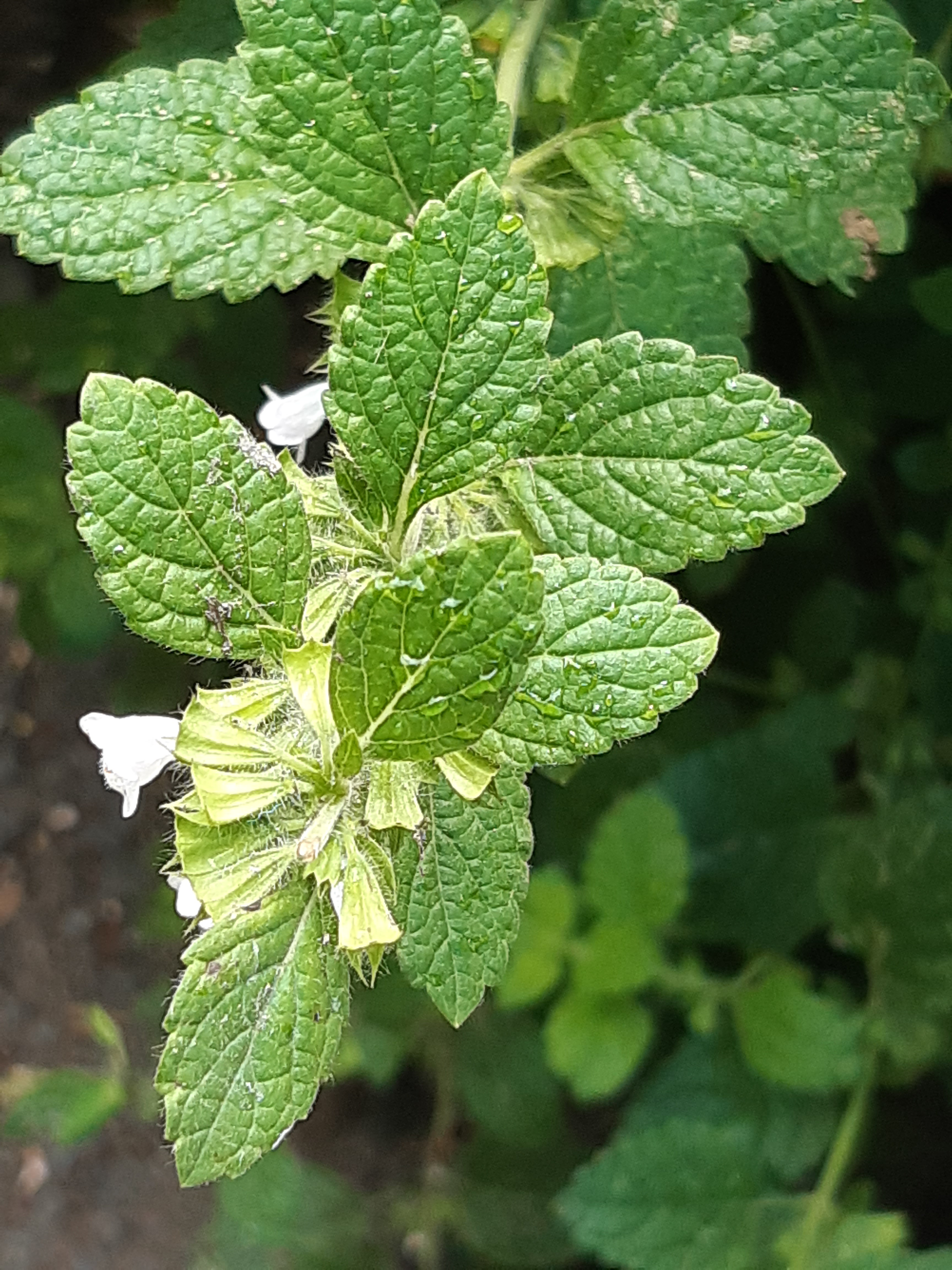
Lemon balm, Melissa officinalis, in car park

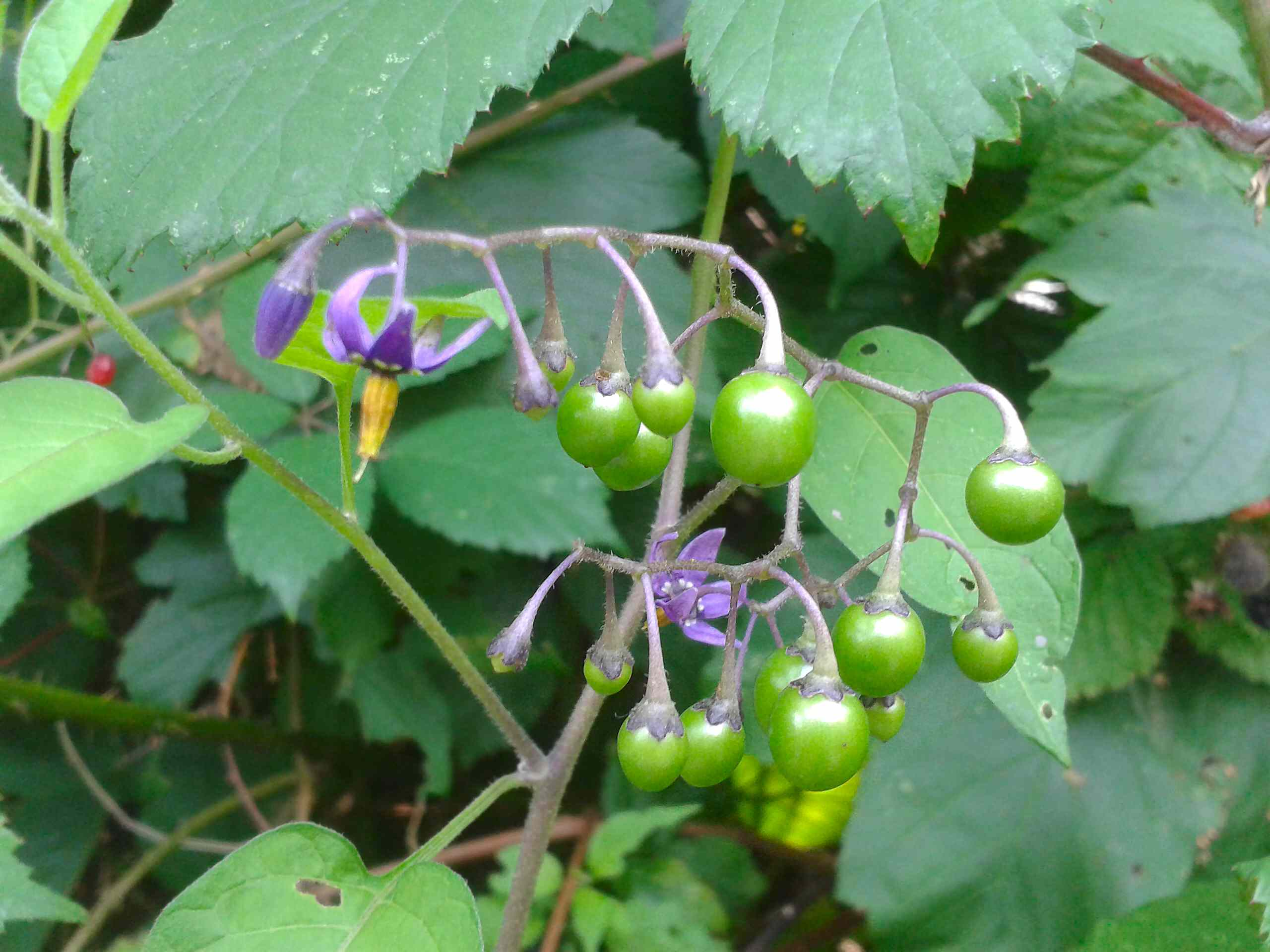
Bittersweet, Solanum dulcamara, on mound

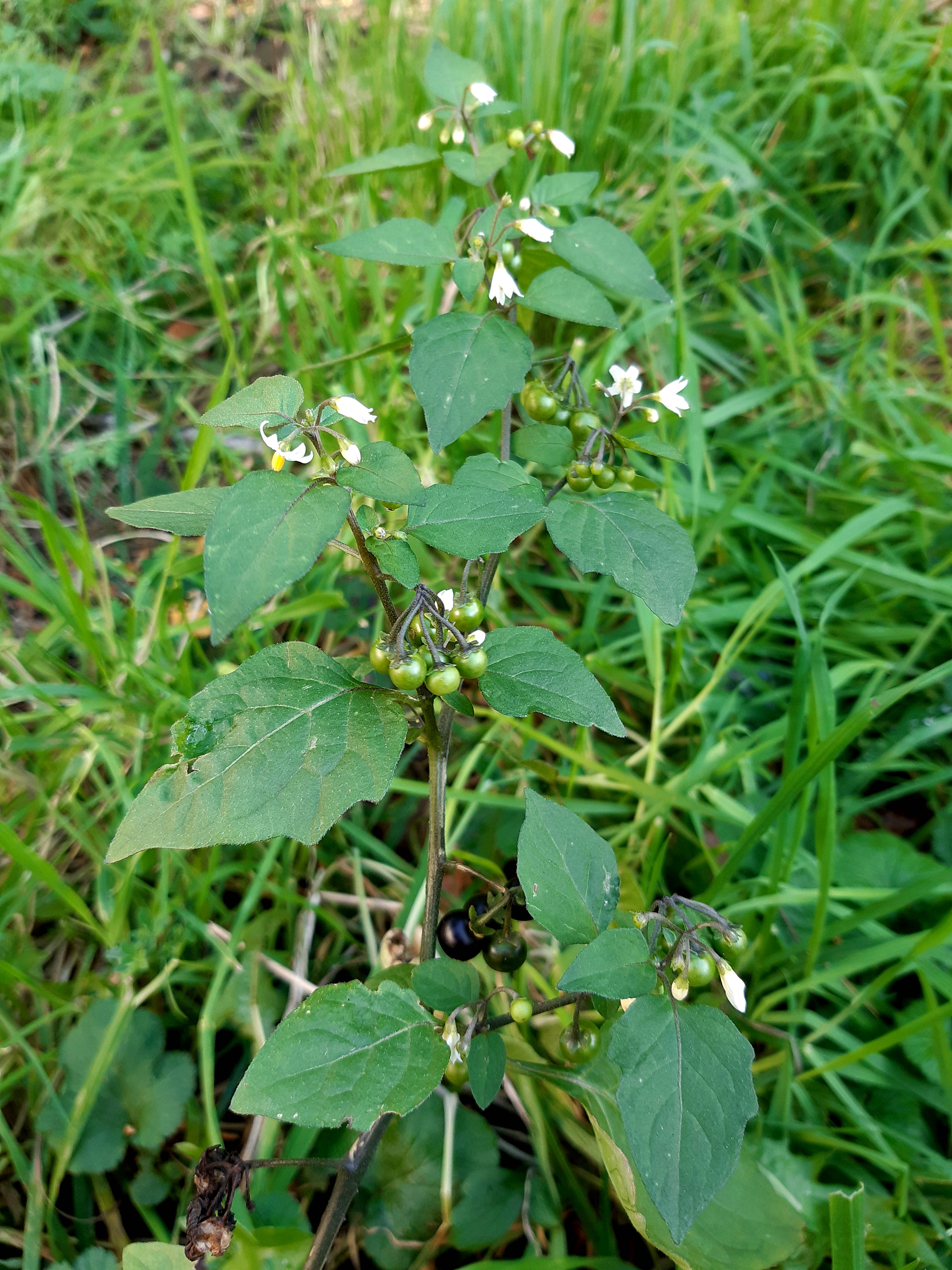
Black nightshade, Solanum nigrum, in small meadow

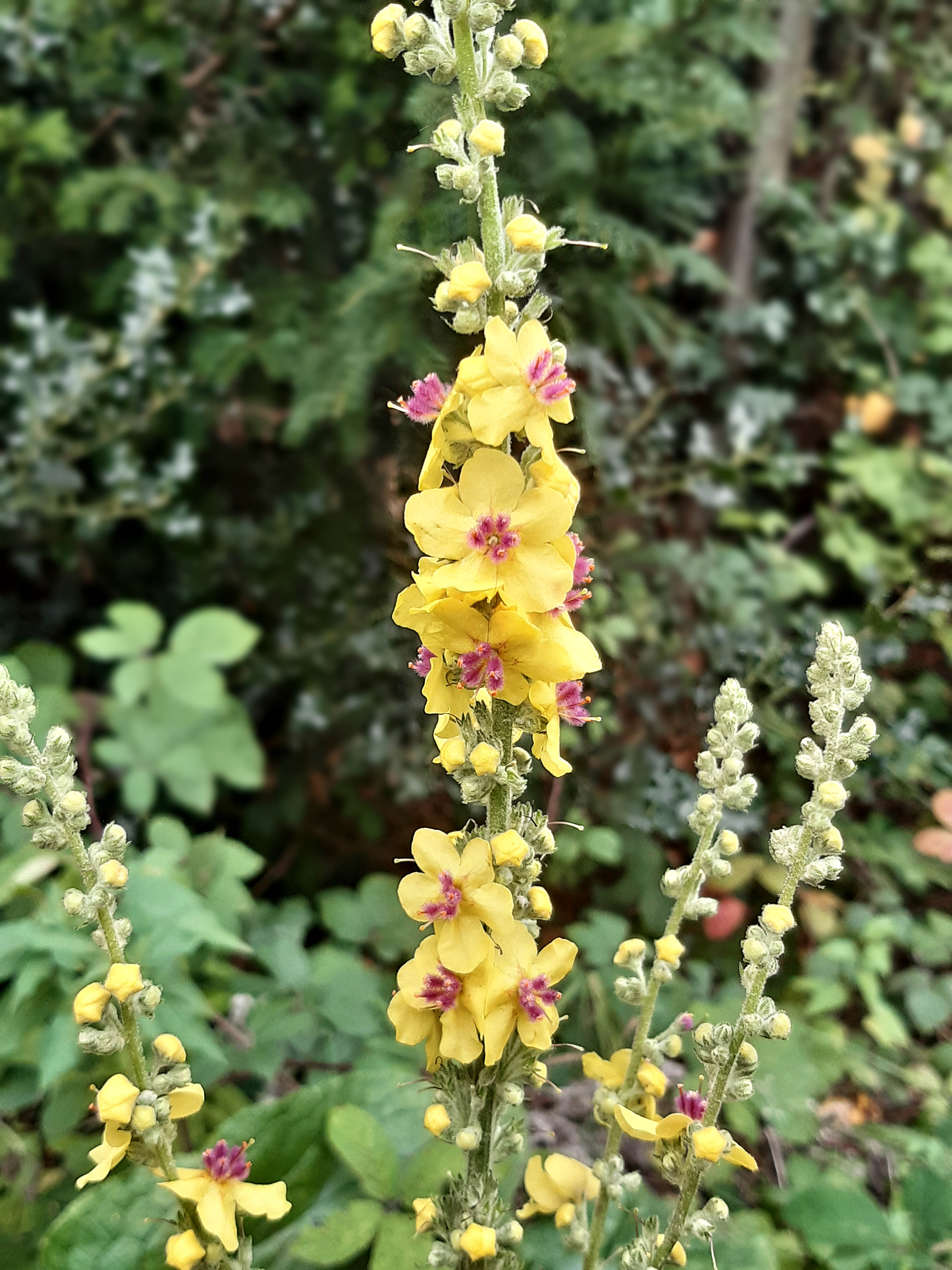
Great mullein, Verbascum thapsus, in the small meadow

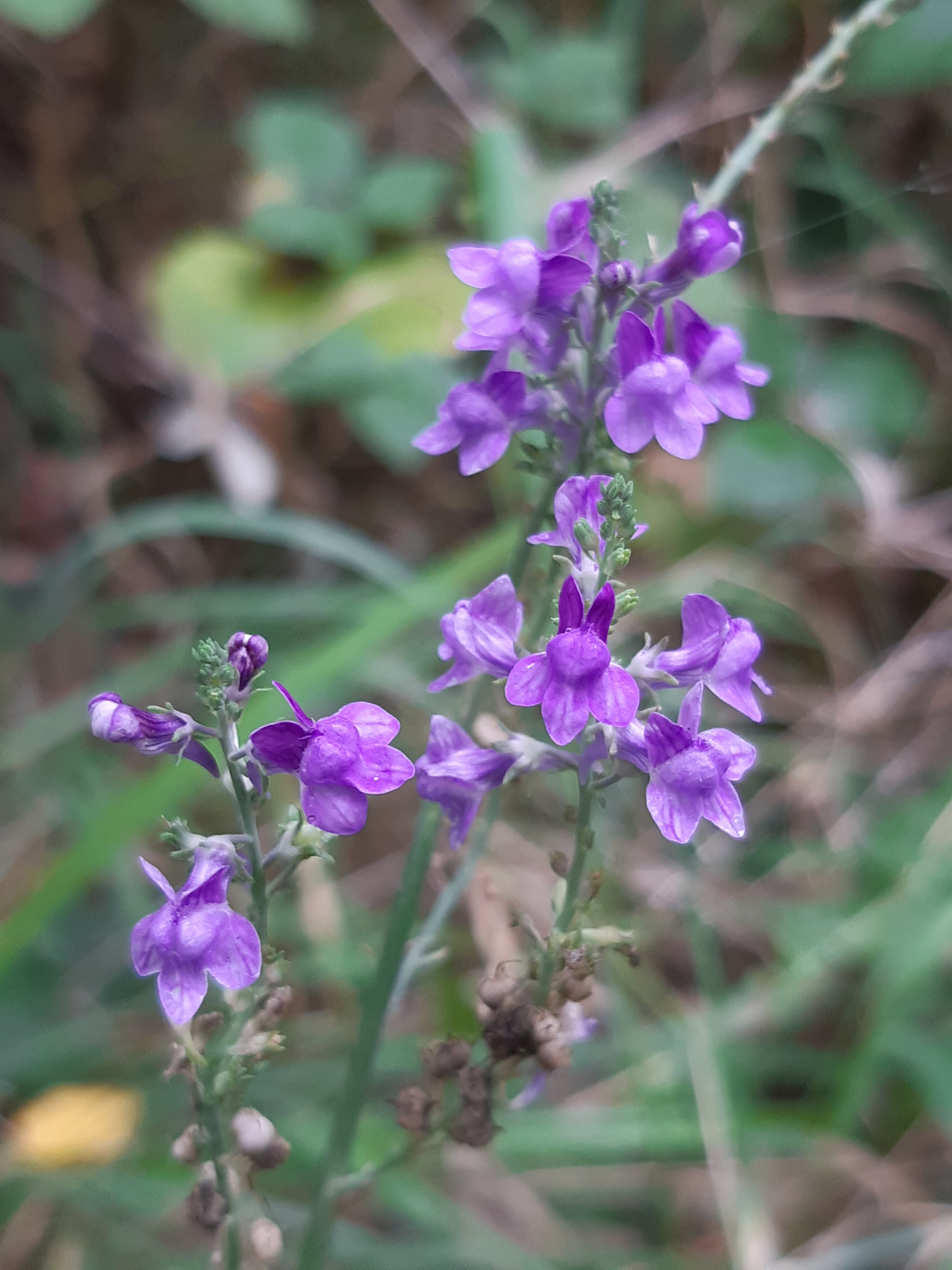
Purple toadflax, Linaria purpurea, on the mound

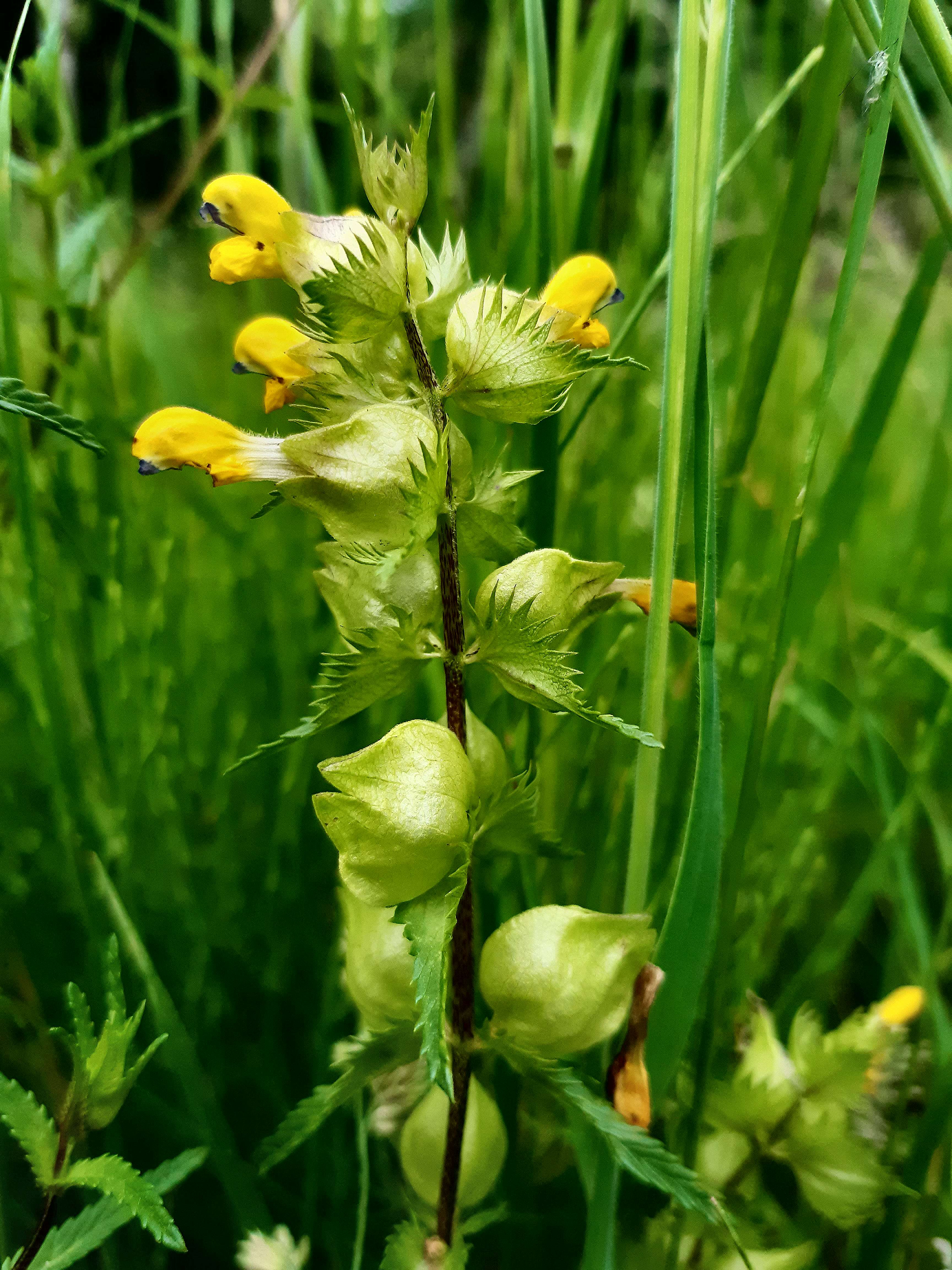
Yellow rattle, Rhinanthus minor, in anthill meadow

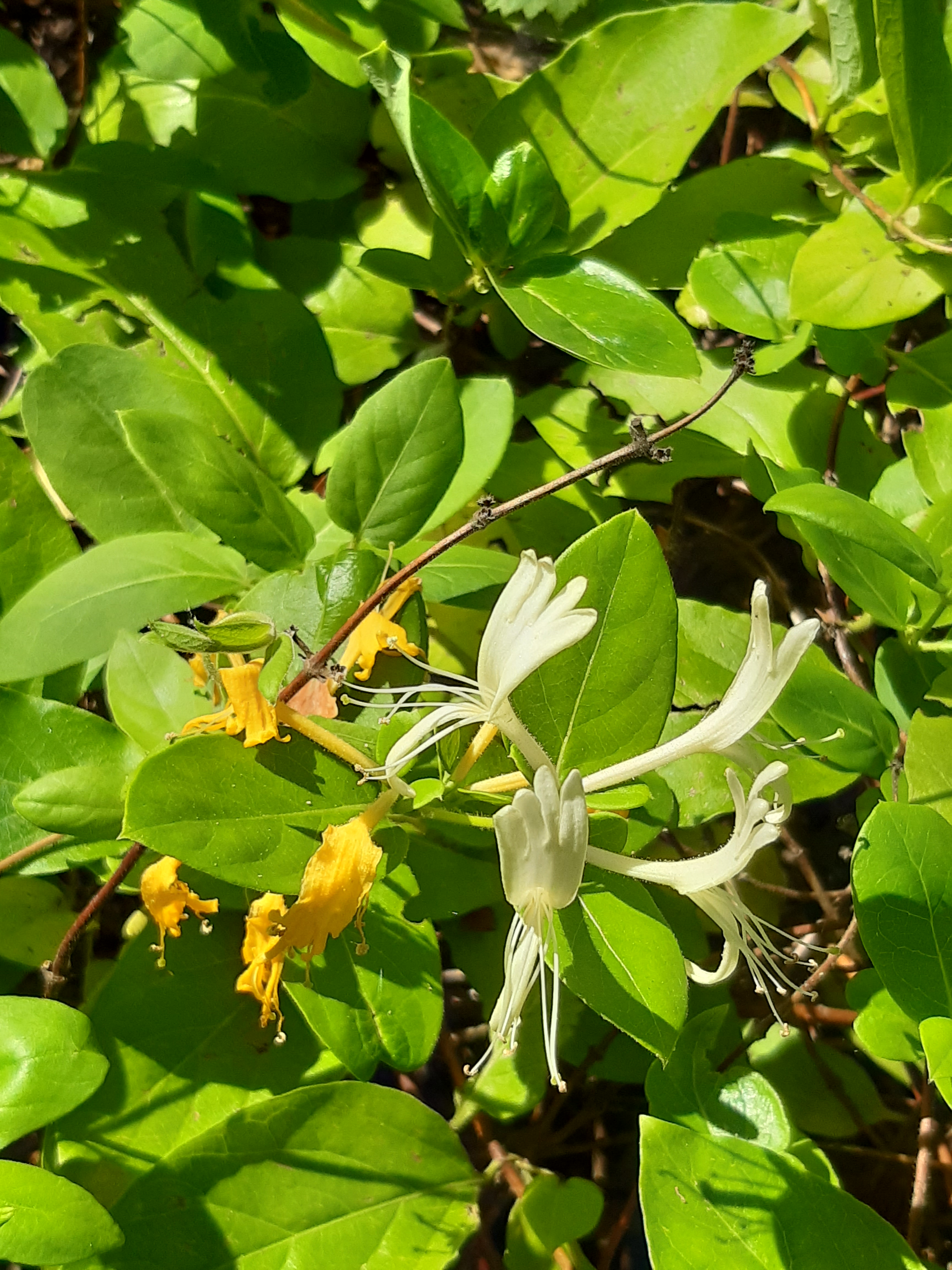
Honeysuckle, Lonicera periclymenum

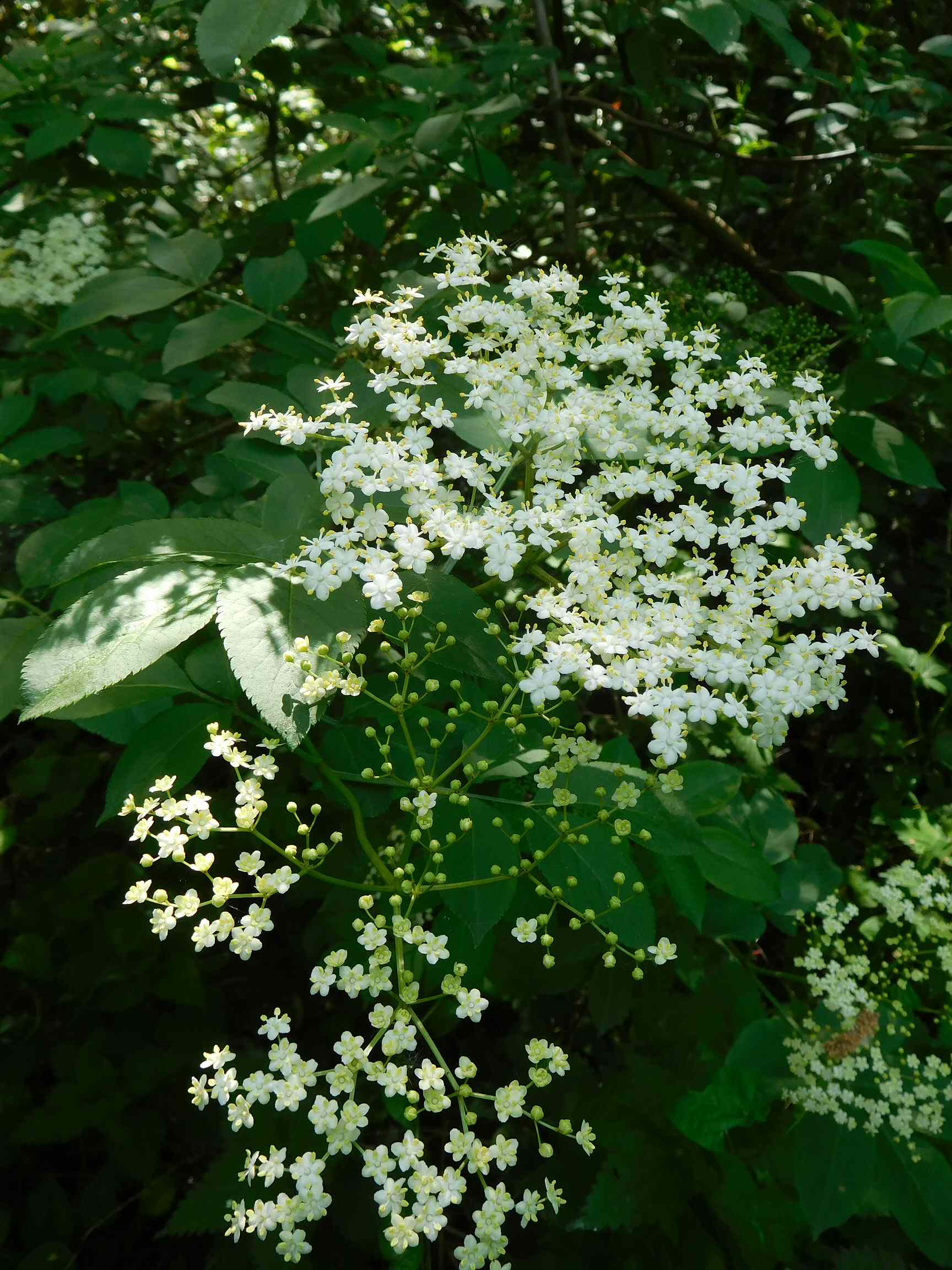
Elder, Sambucus nigra, in flower as an undershrub

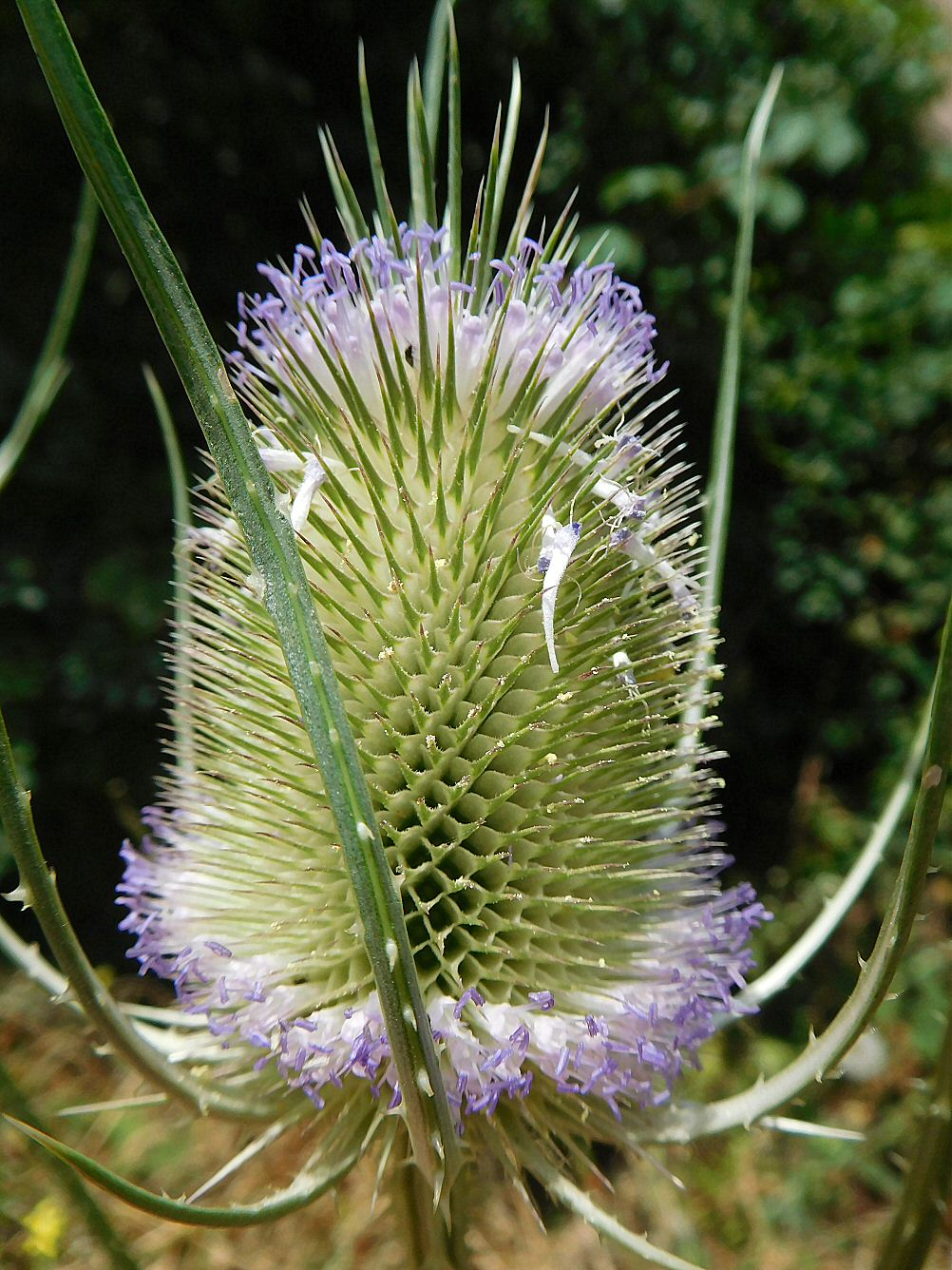
Teasel flowerhead, Dipsacus fullonum

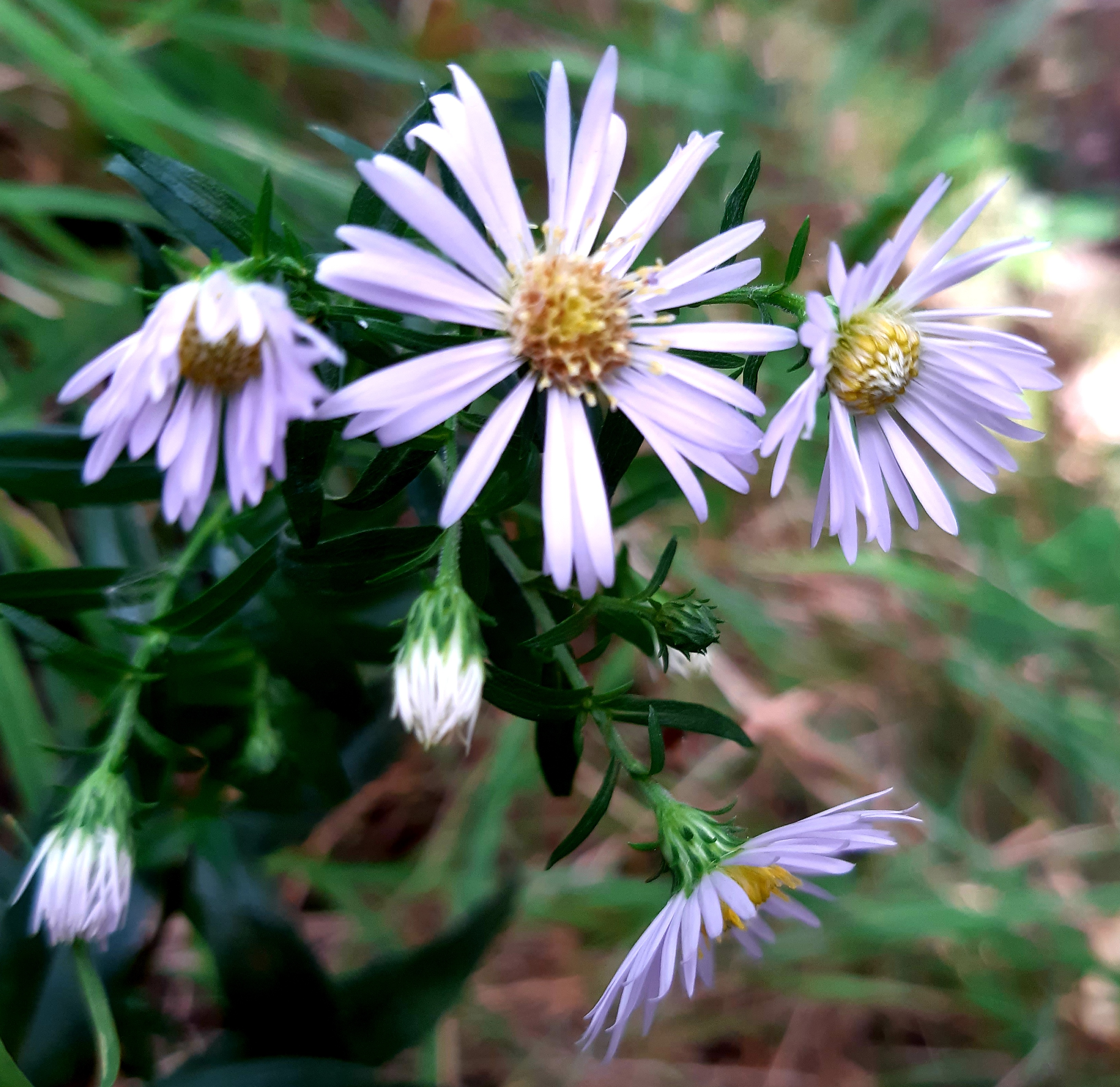
Michaelmas daisy, cf. Aster amellus, on the mound

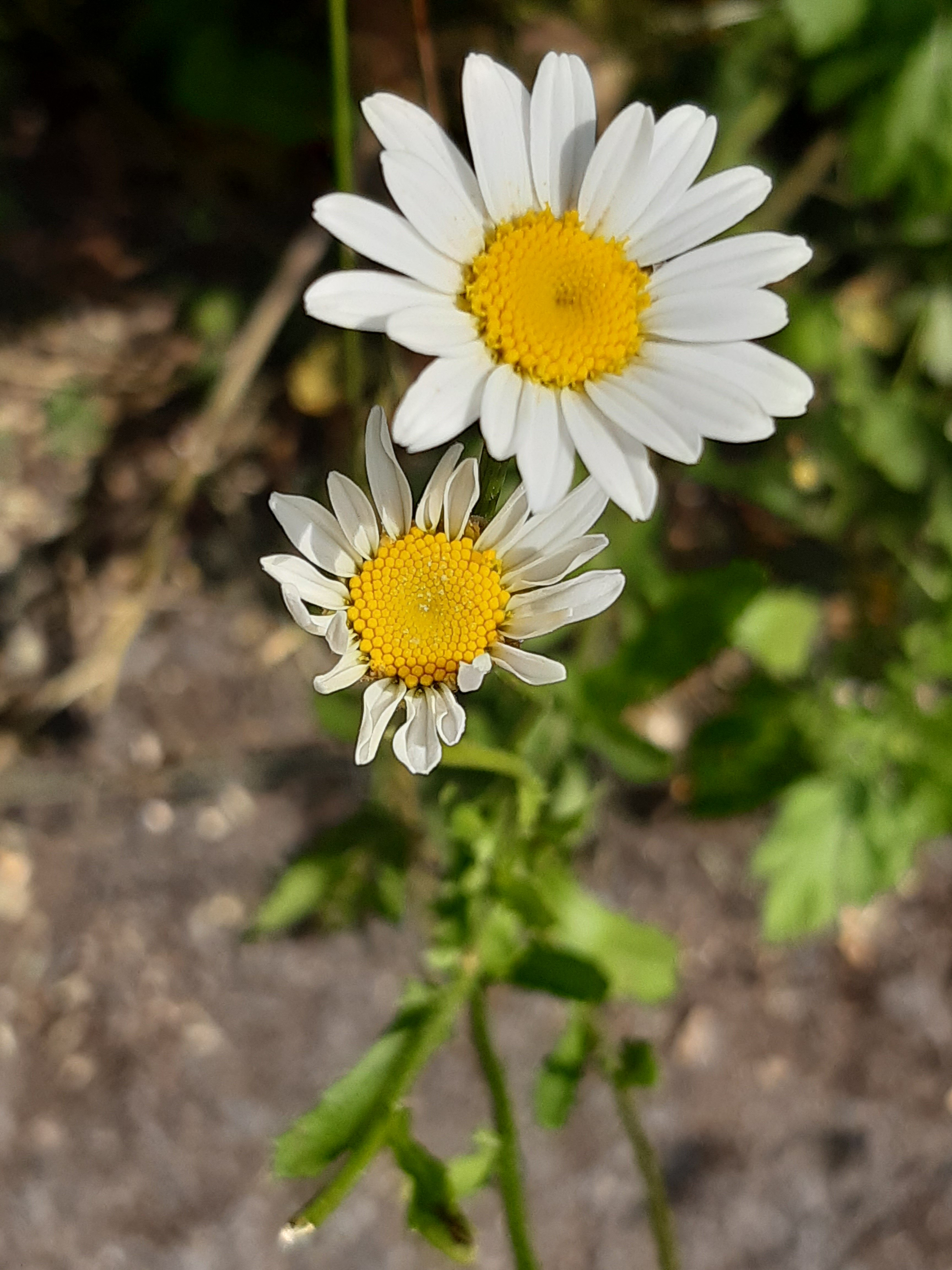
Oxeye Daisy, Leucanthemum vulgare, on ramp

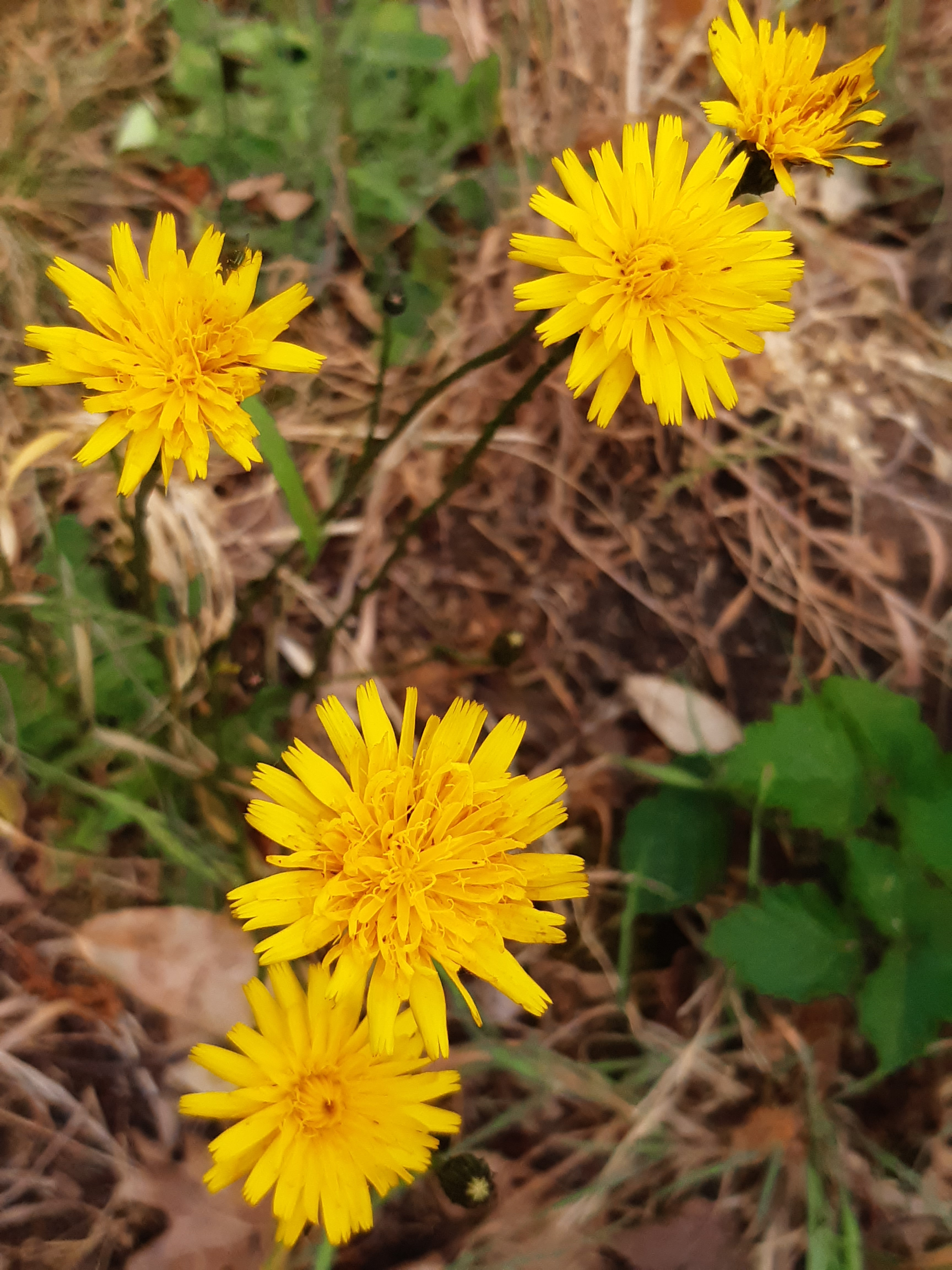
Common catsear, Hypochaeris radicata, on acid grassland

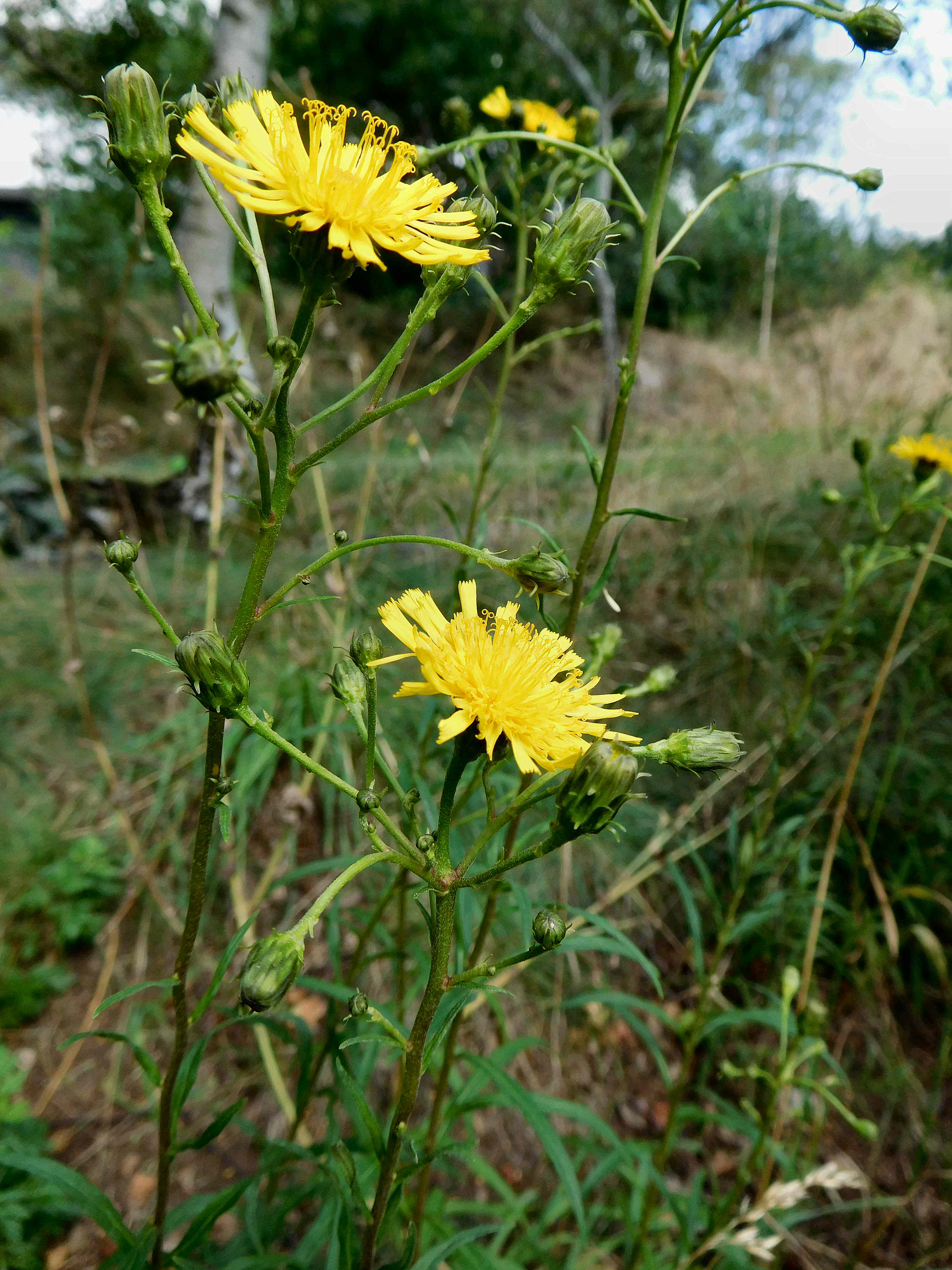
Narrow-Leaved hawksbeard, Crepis tectorum, beside old railway track

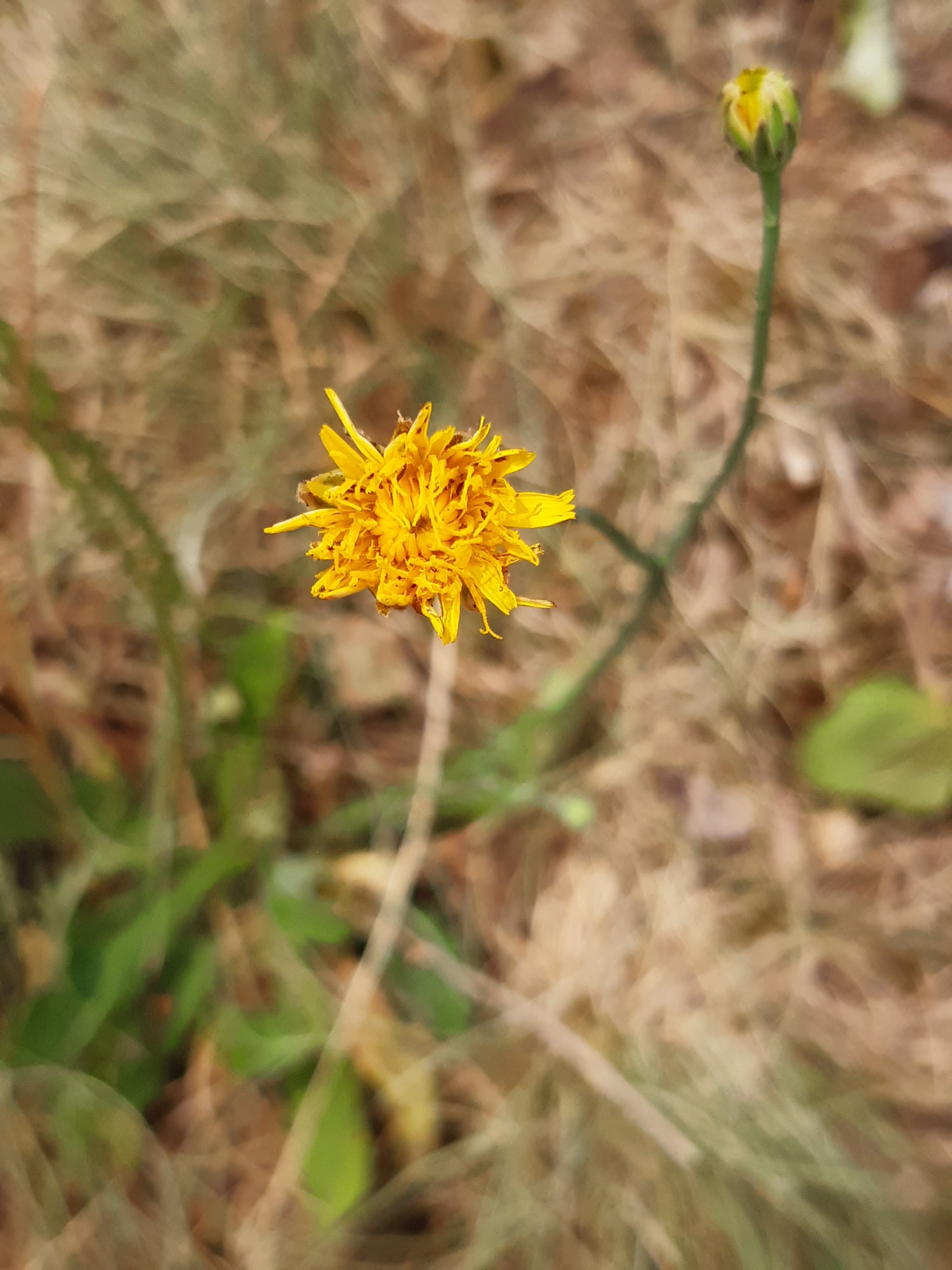
Mouse-ear hawkweed, Pilosella officinarum, on acid grassland

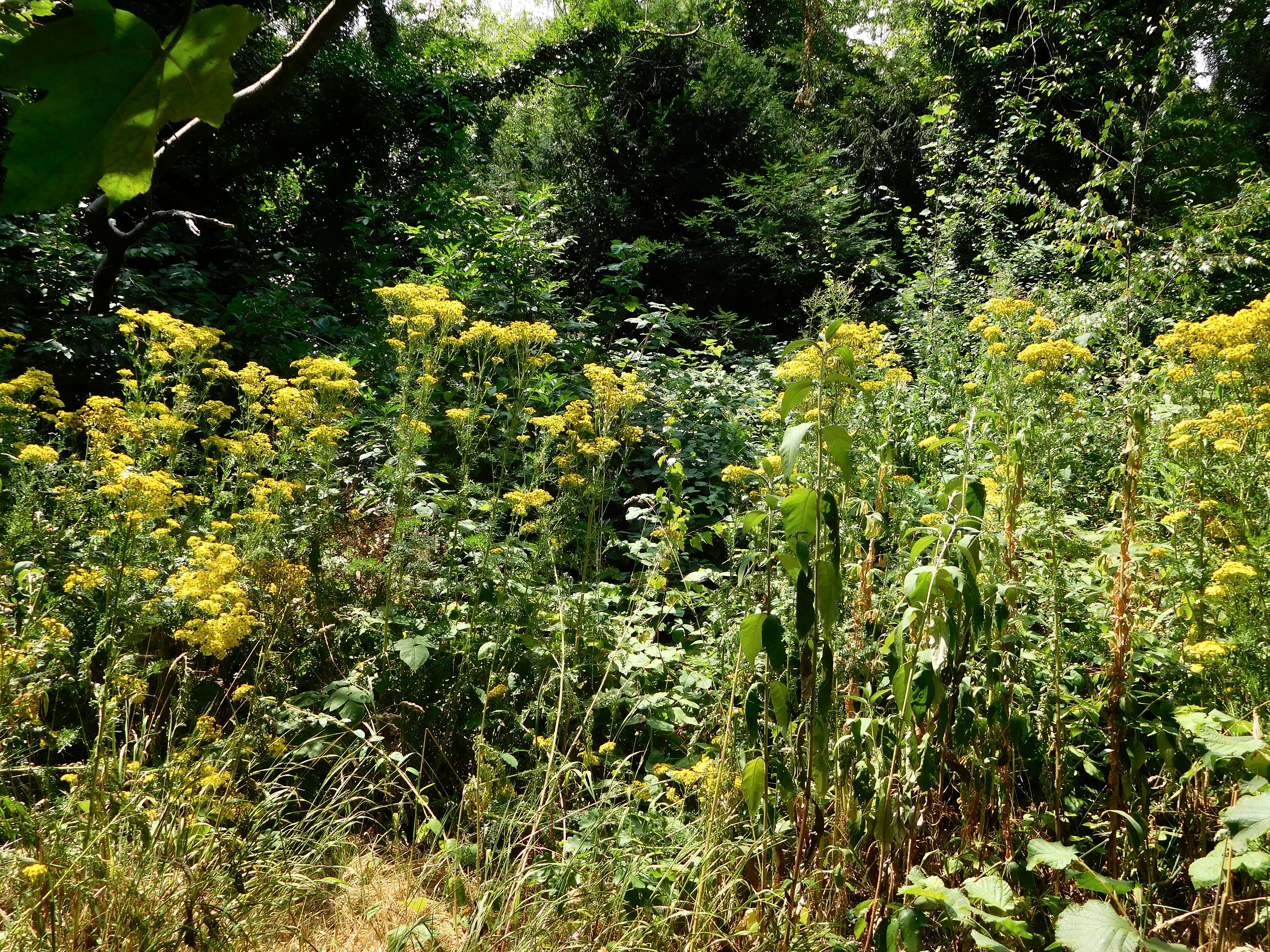
Ragwort, Jacobaea vulgaris, in a clearing made by a fallen birch tree

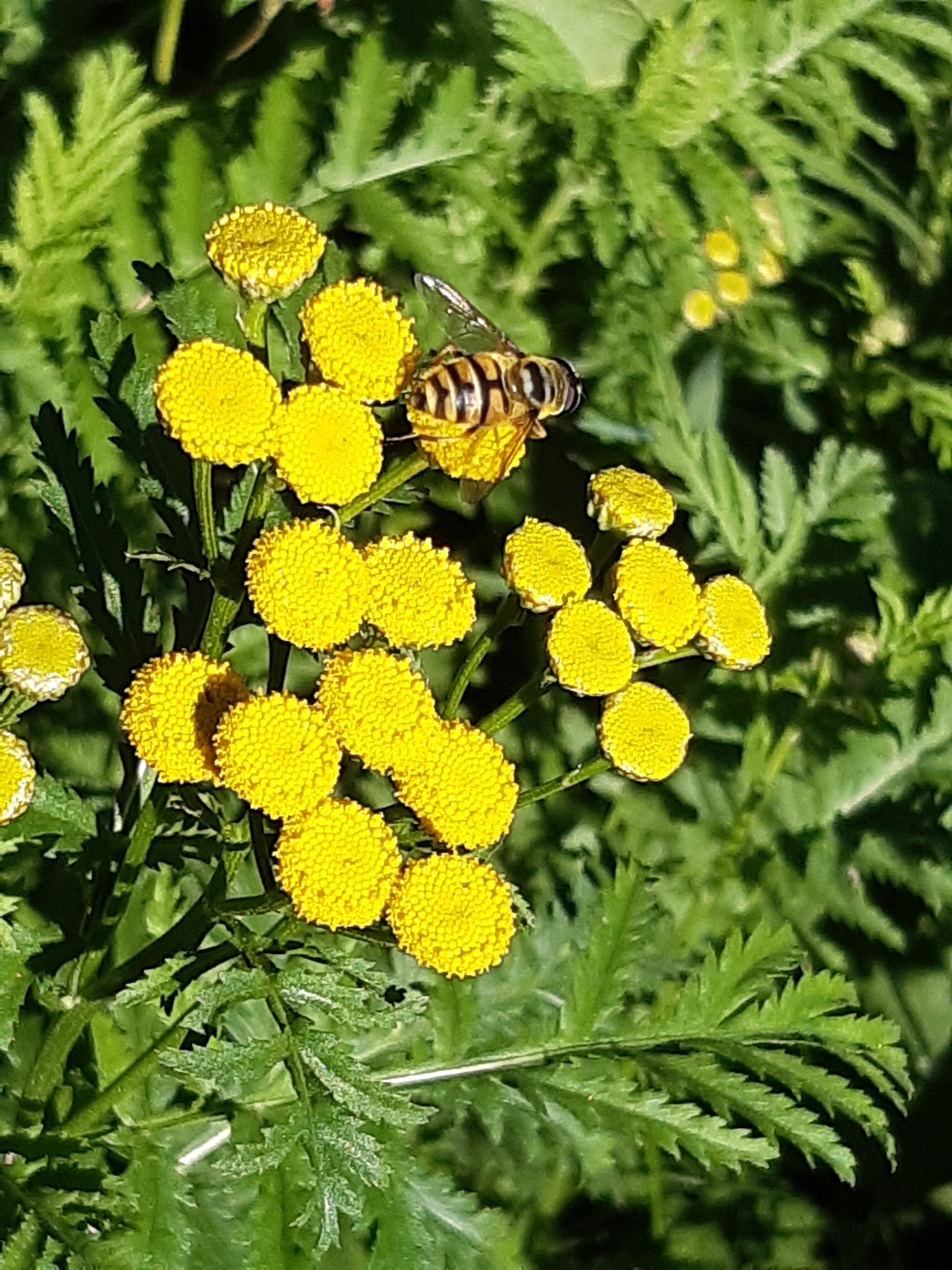
Tansy, Tanacetum vulgare, in demonstration meadow

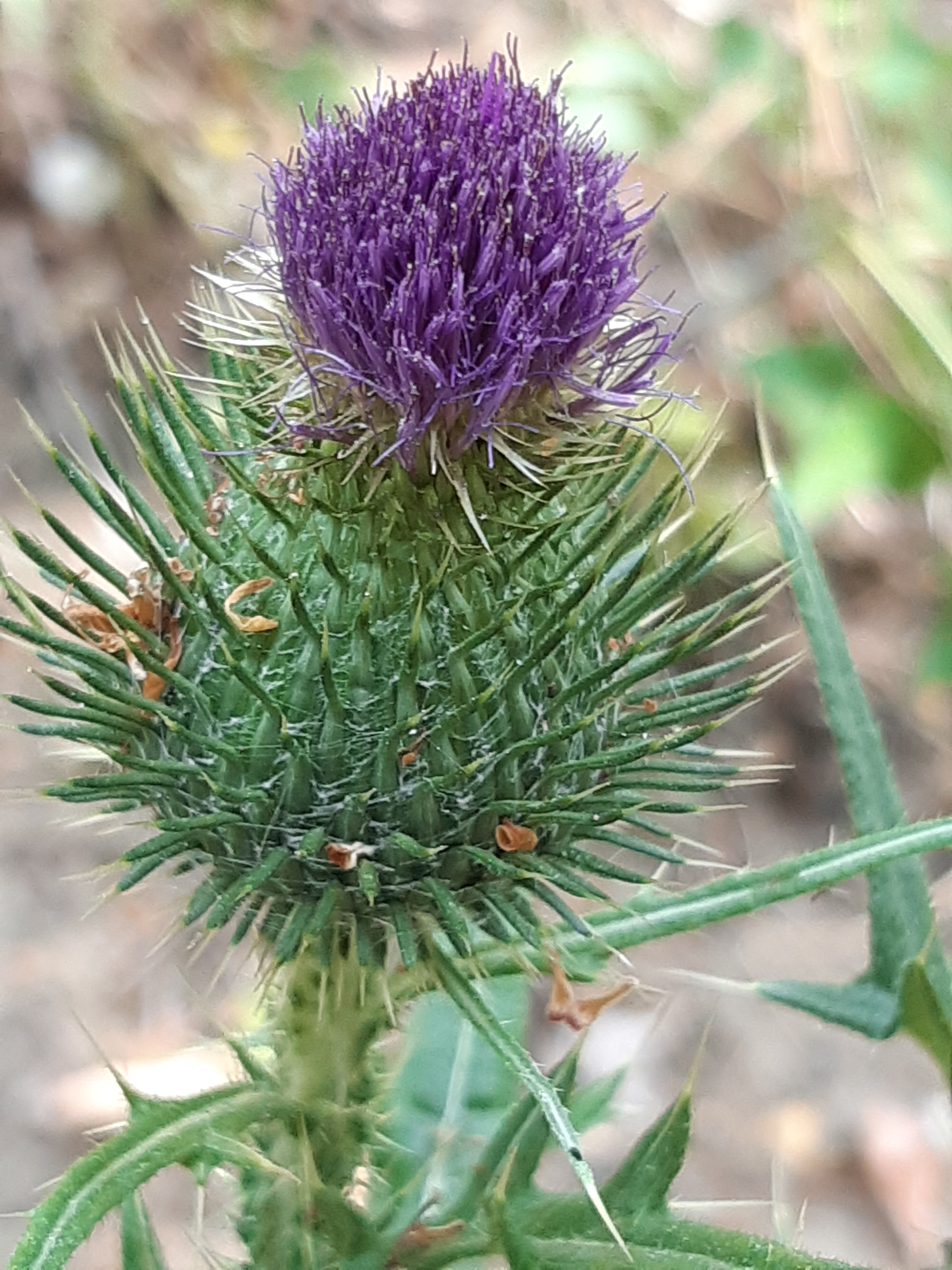
Spear thistle, Cirsium vulgare, on North Bank

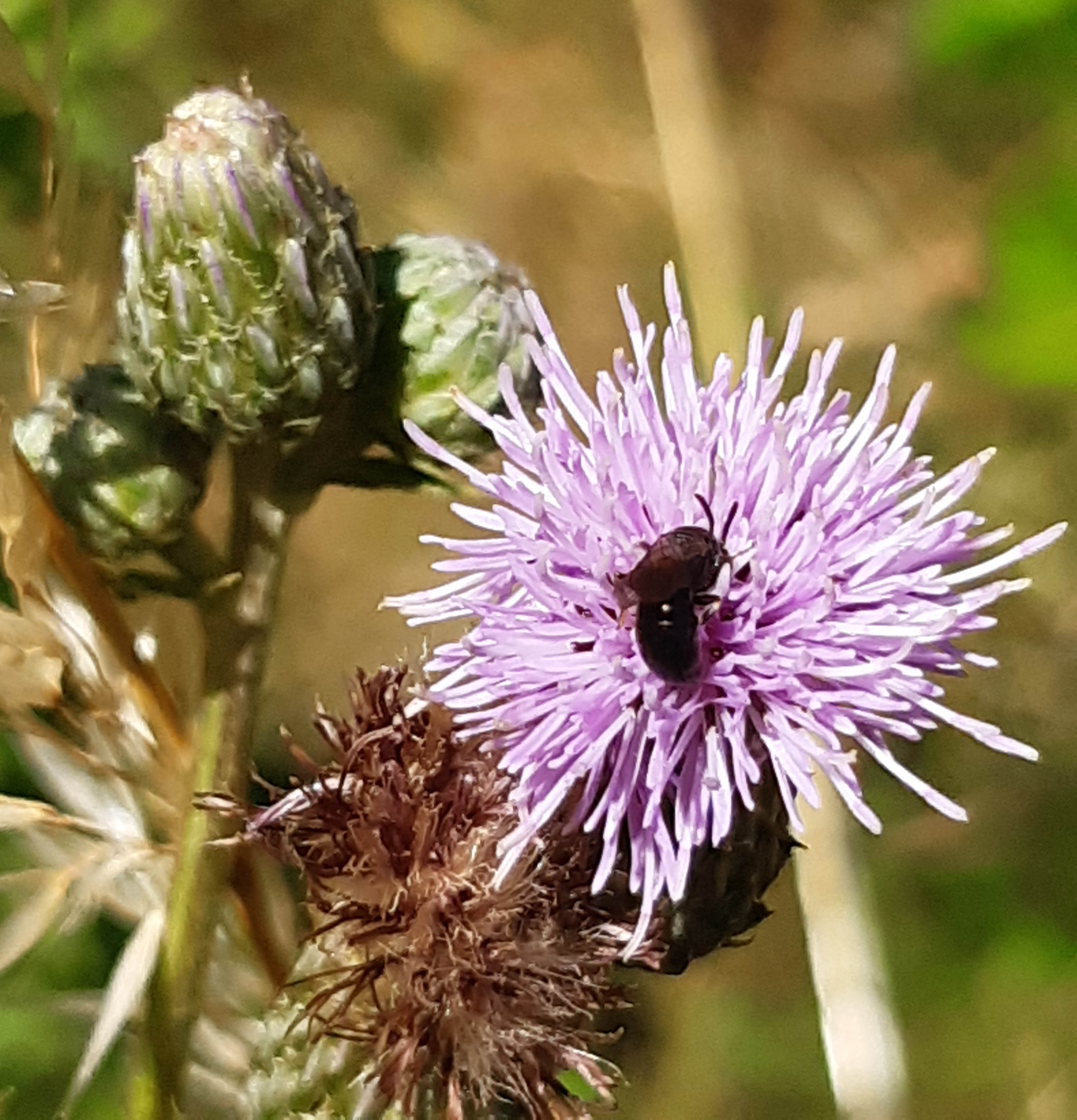
Creeping thistle, Cirsium arvense, in Small Meadow

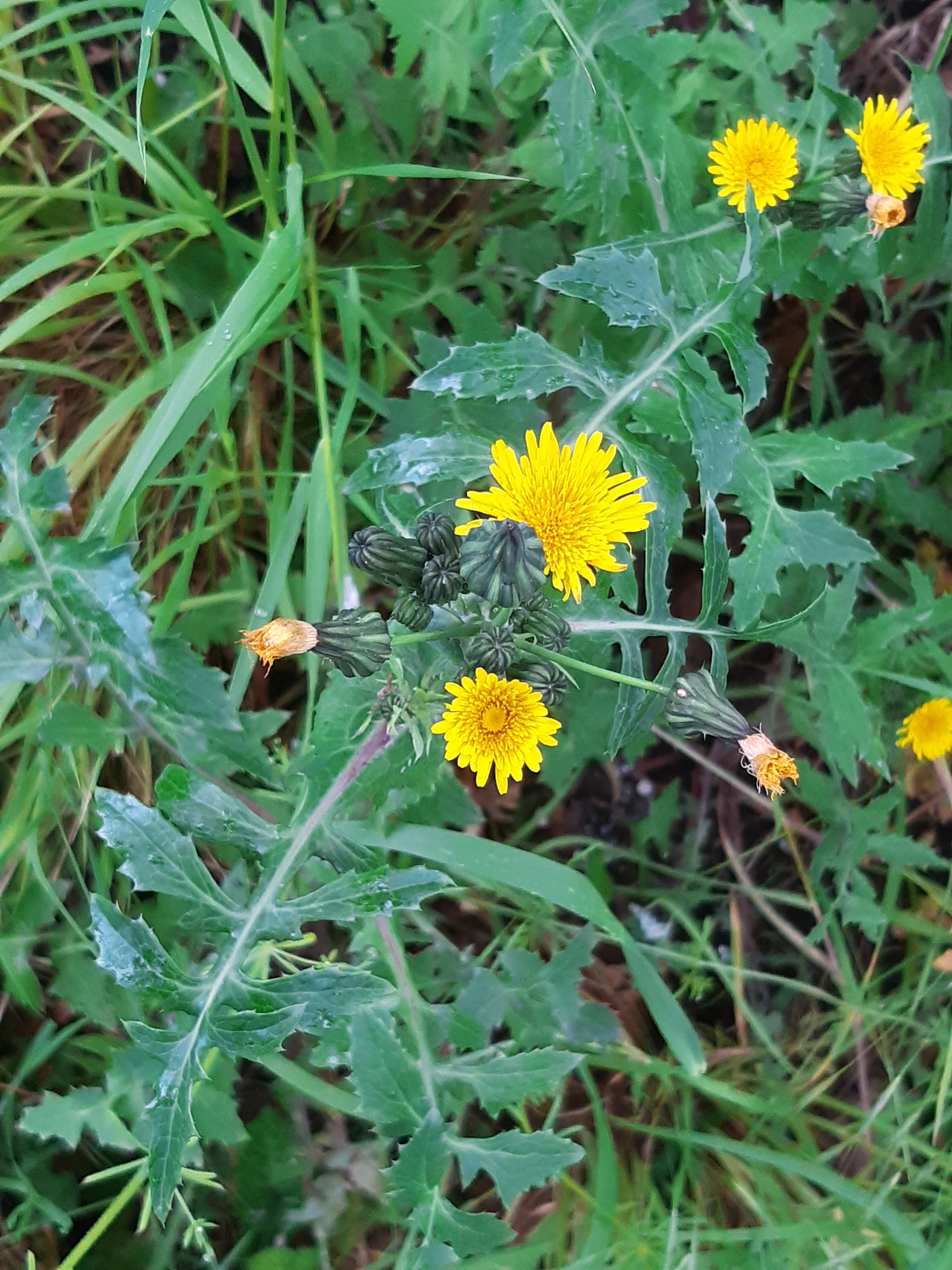
Smooth sow-thistle, Sonchus oleraceus, by North bank

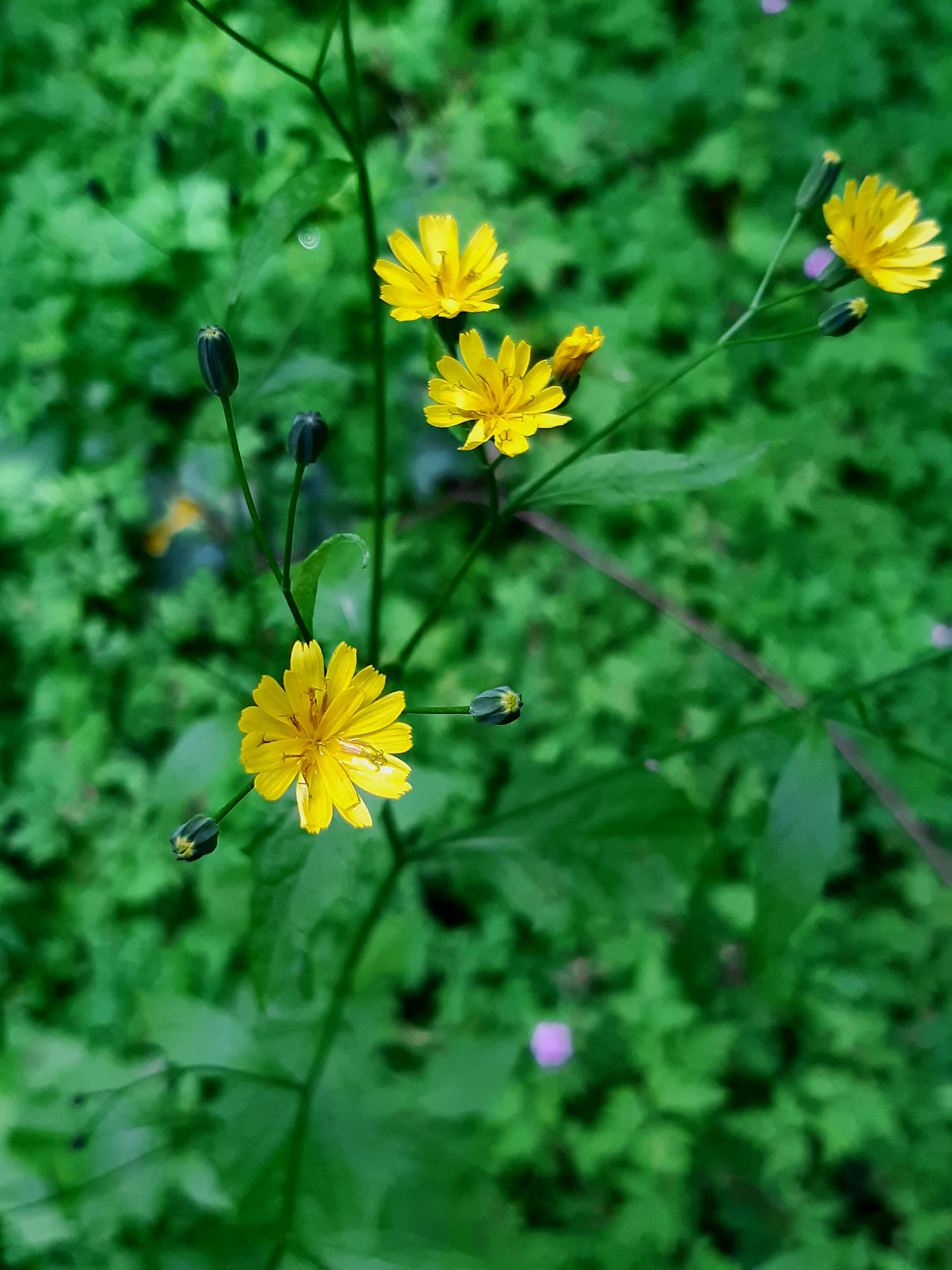
Nipplewort, Lapsana communis, under North Bank, recently cleared of bramble

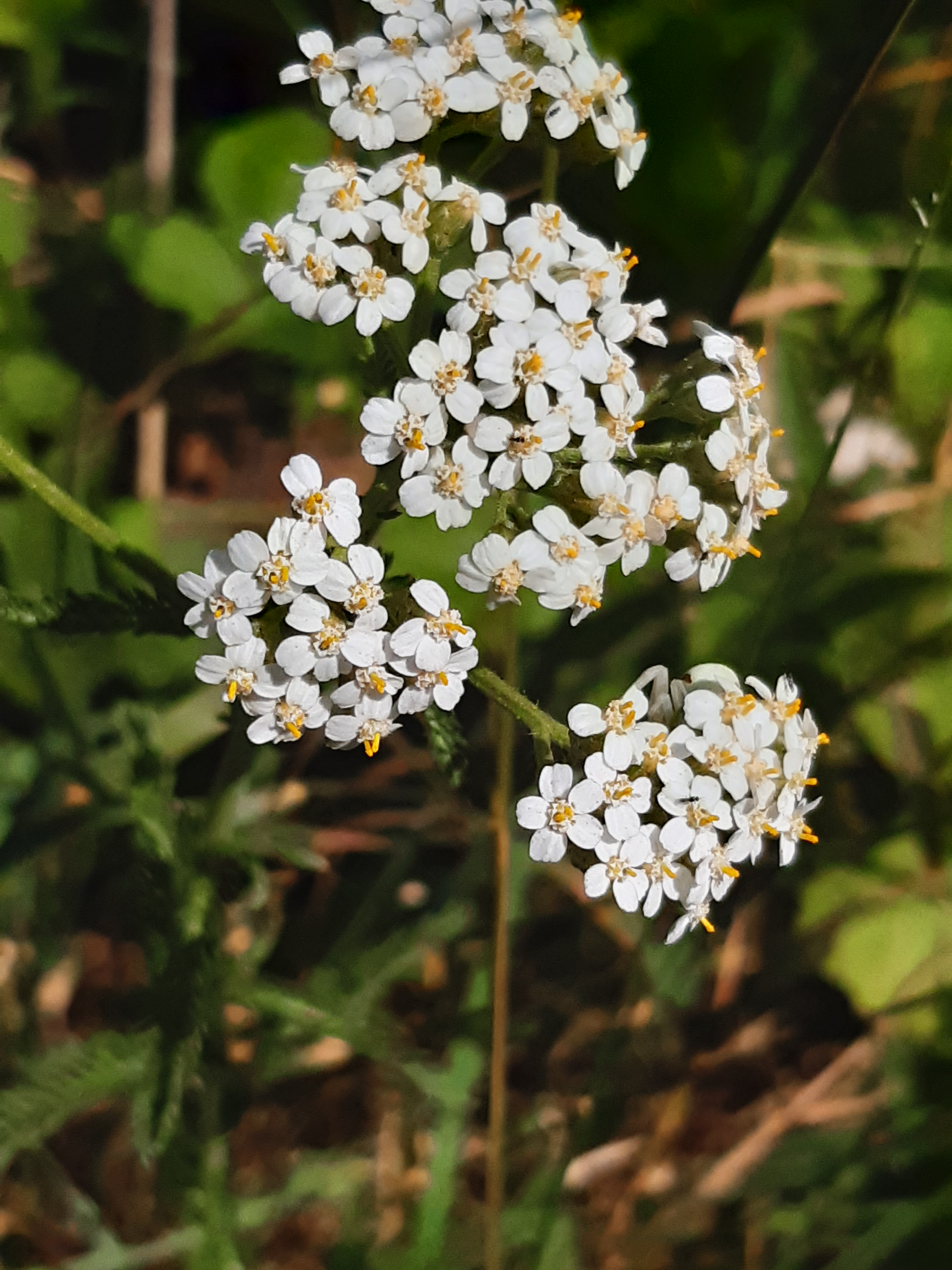
Yarrow, Achillea millefolium, on Ramp Meadow

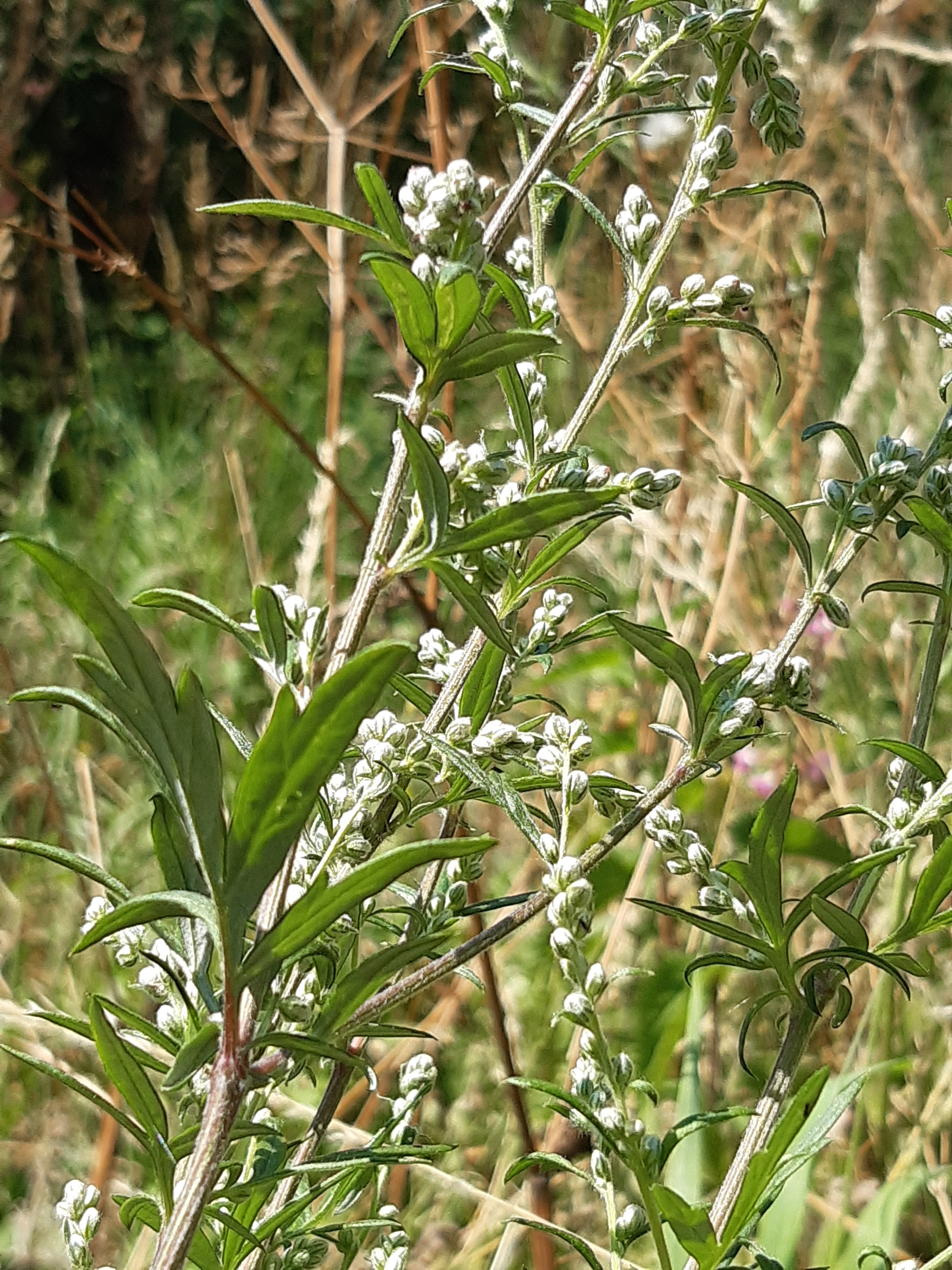
Mugwort, Artemisia vulgaris, on Ramp Meadow

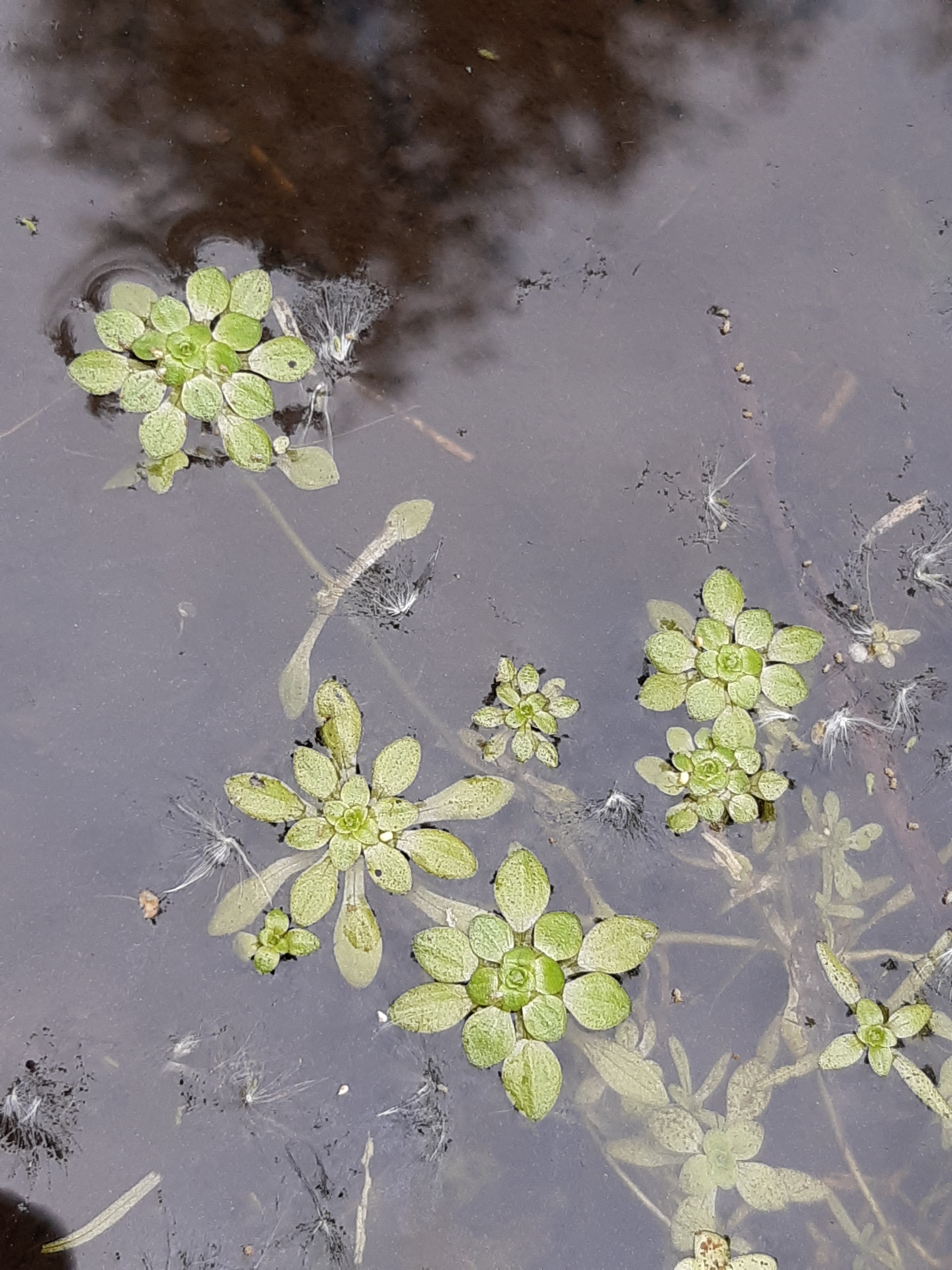
Water starwort, Callitriche stagnans, in main pond

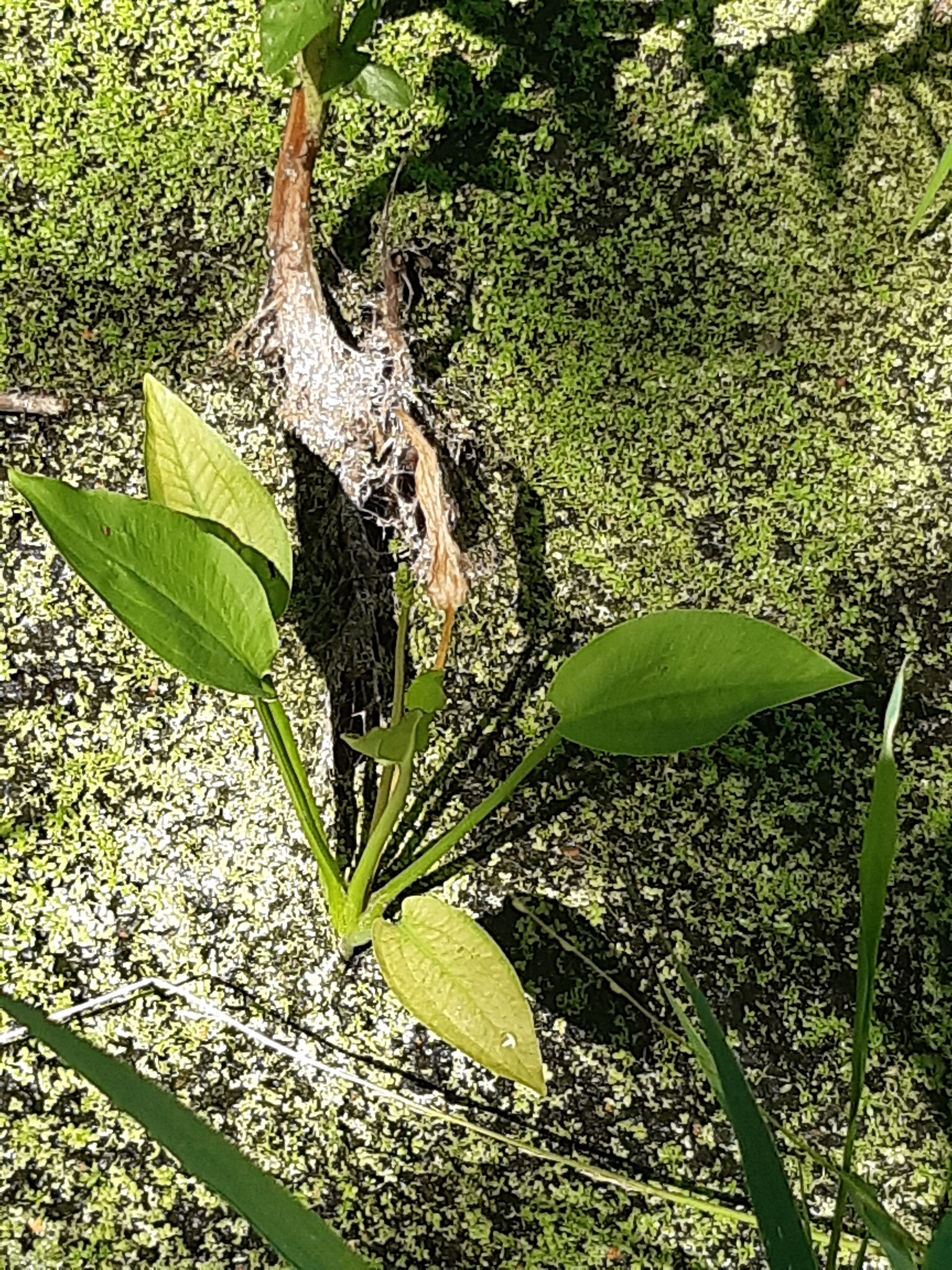
Water plantain, Alisma plantago-aquatica, in main pond

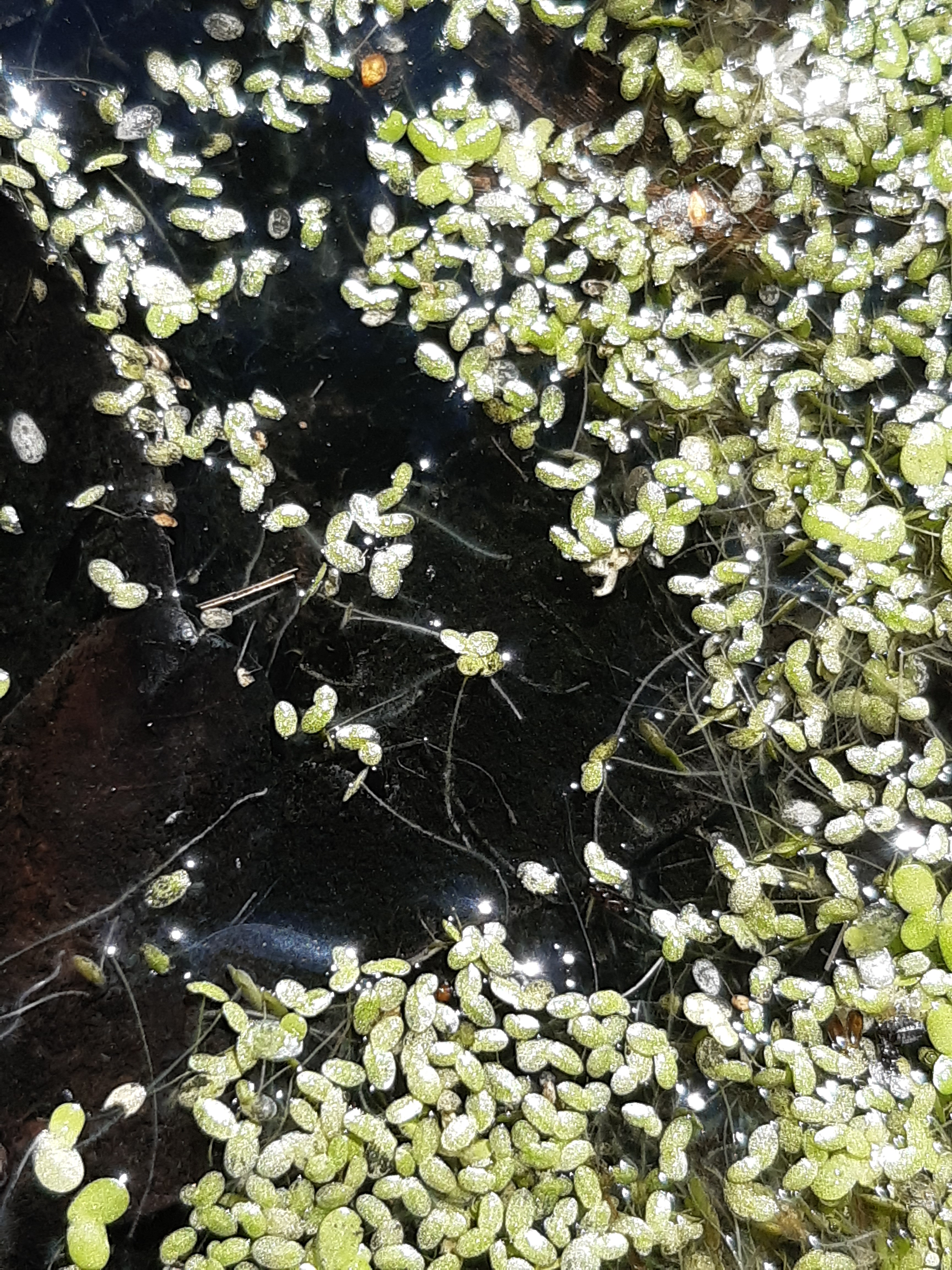
Duckweed, Lemna minor, in main pond

Monocots
Monocots

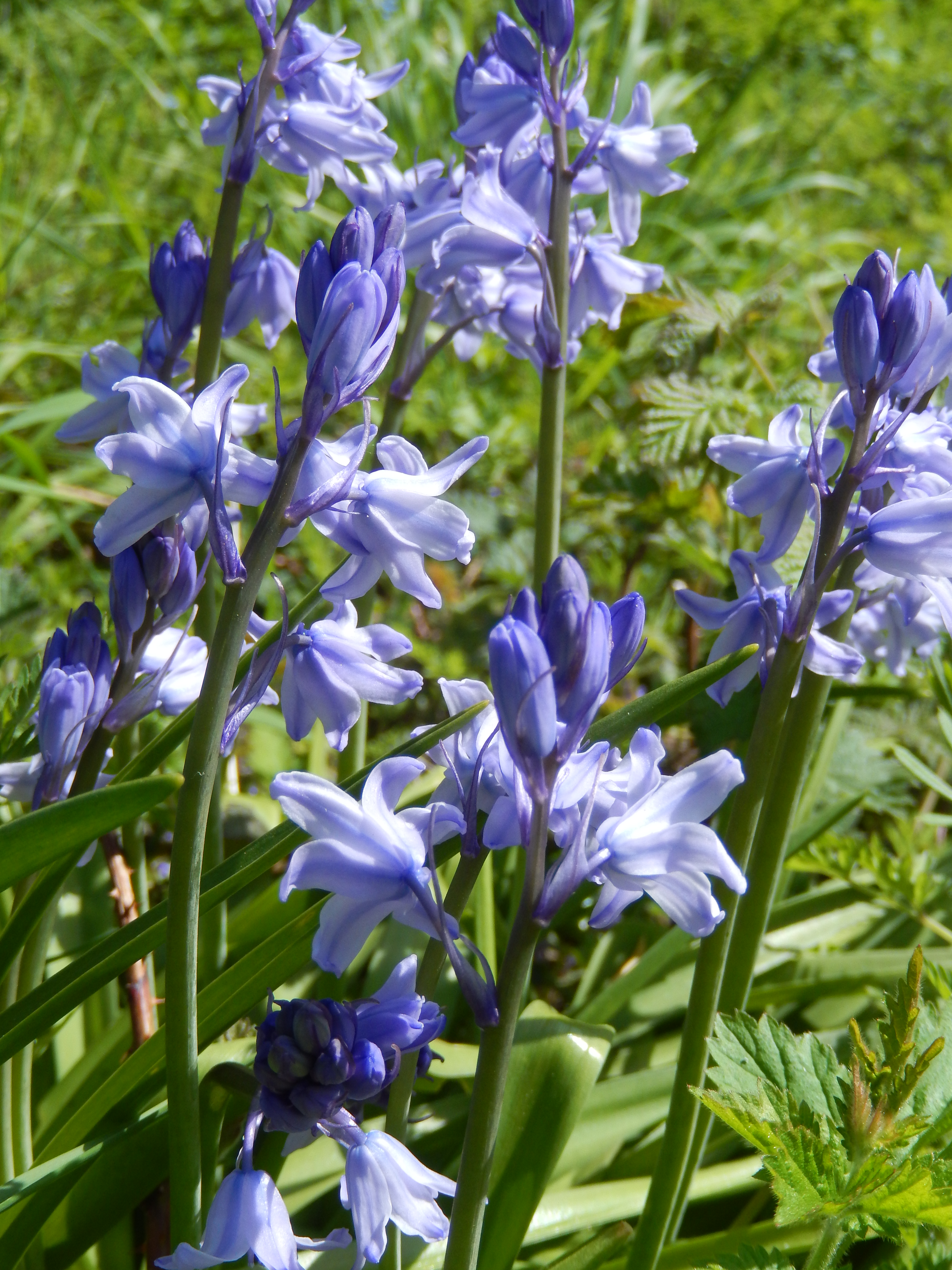
Spanish bluebells, Hyacinthoides hispanica

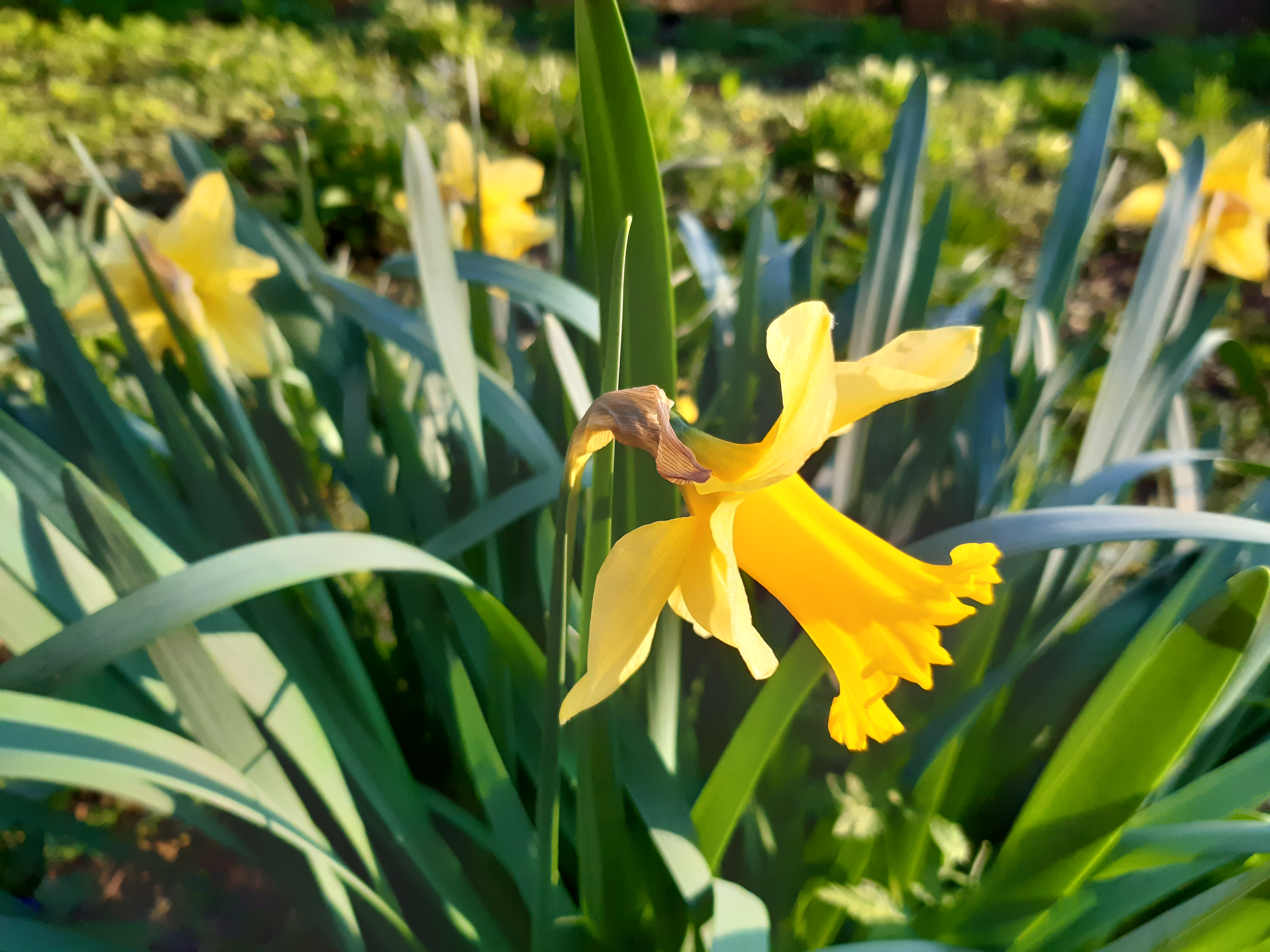
Daffodils, Narcissus, naturalised on Ramp Meadow

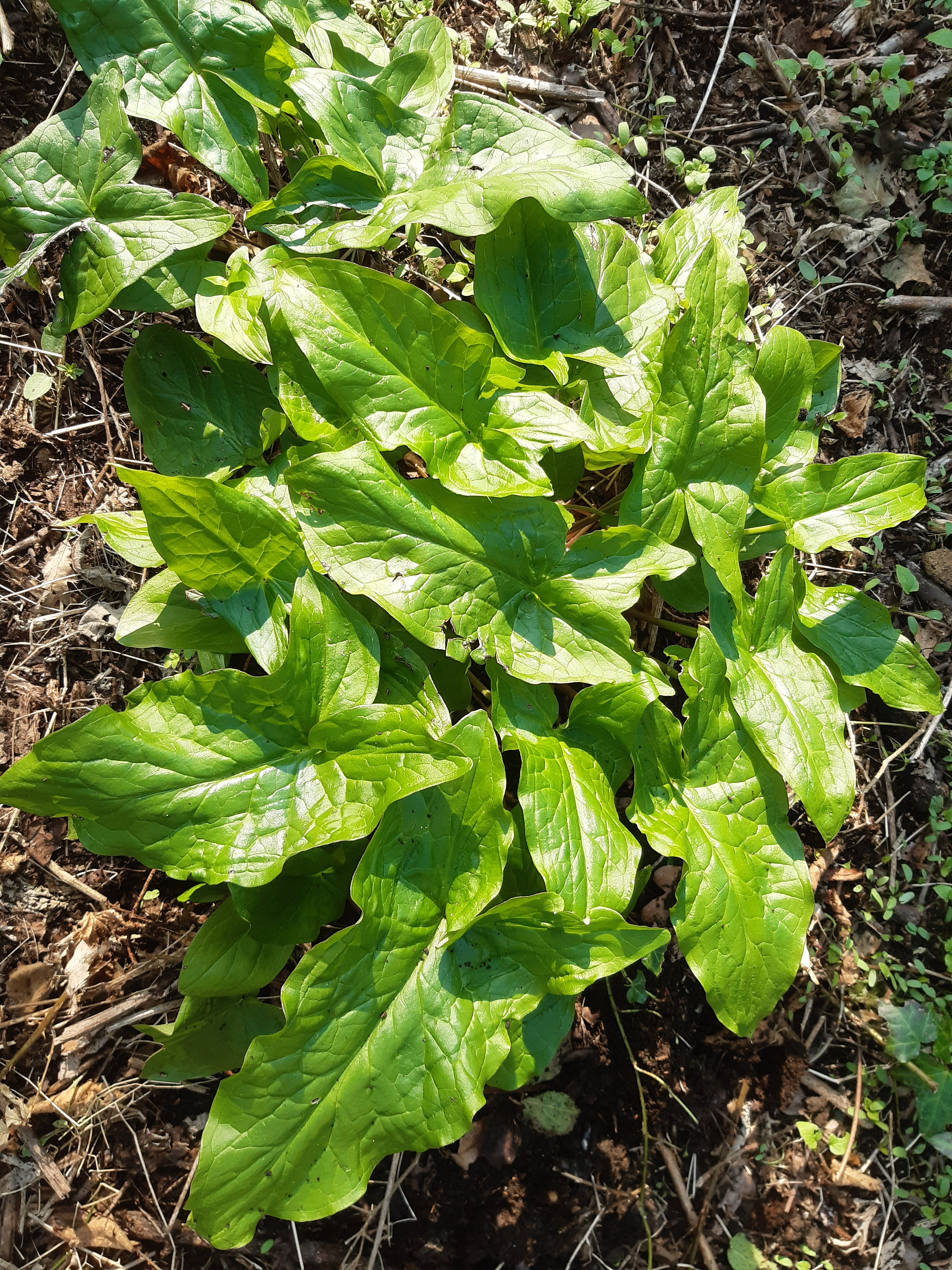
Lords and ladies, Arum maculatum, on North Bank

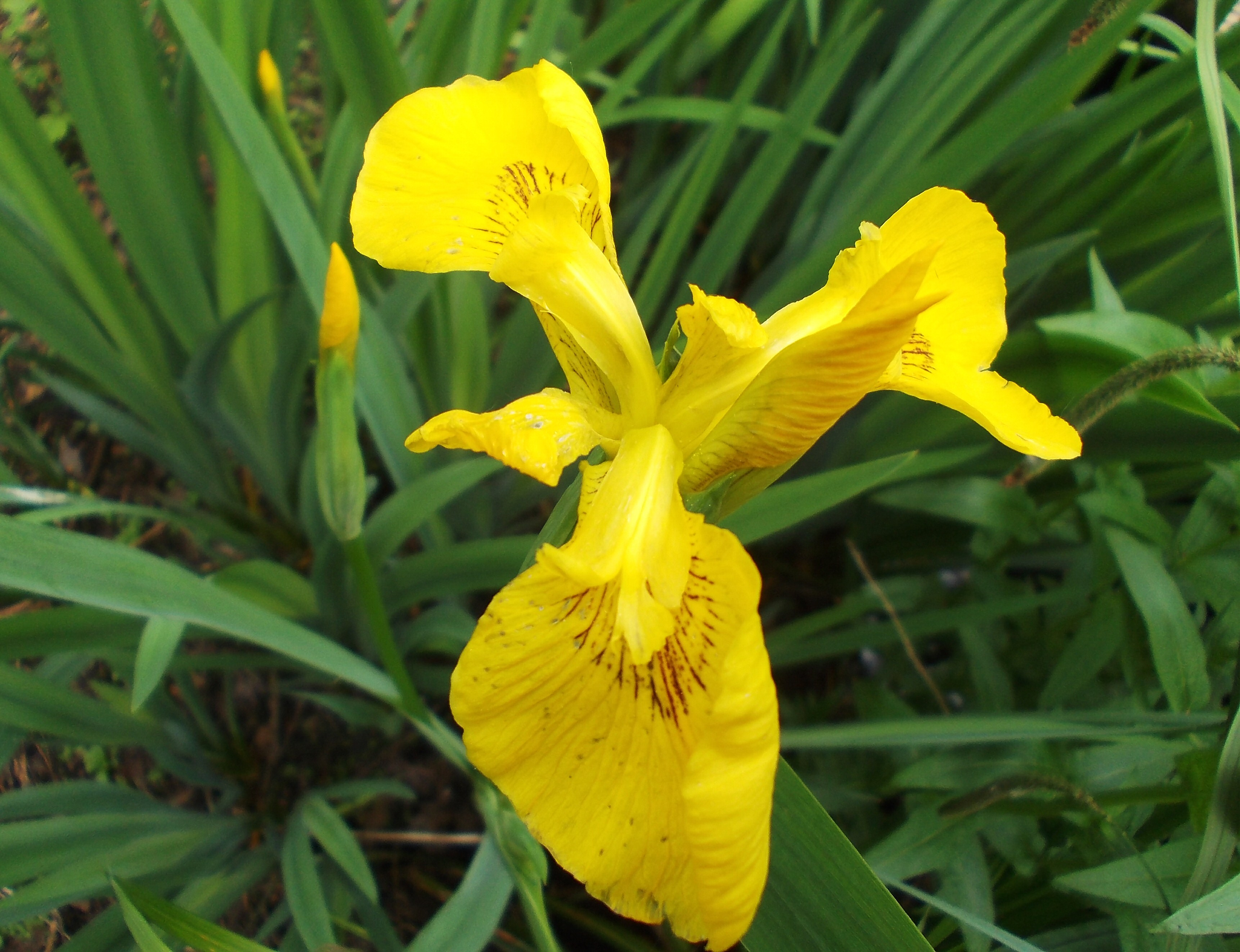
Yellow iris or flag, Iris pseudacorus

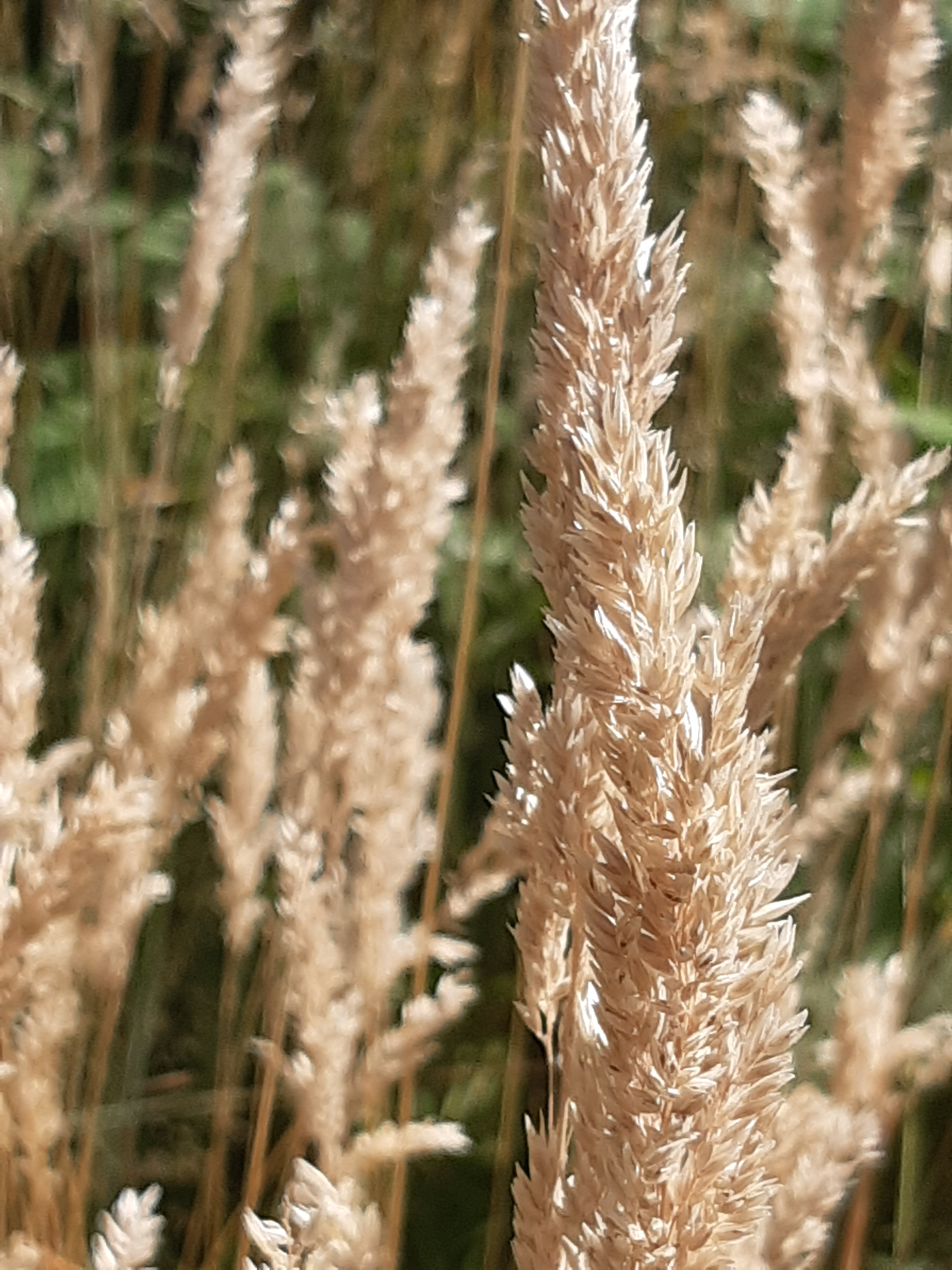
Yorkshire Fog, Holcus lanatus, in Small Meadow

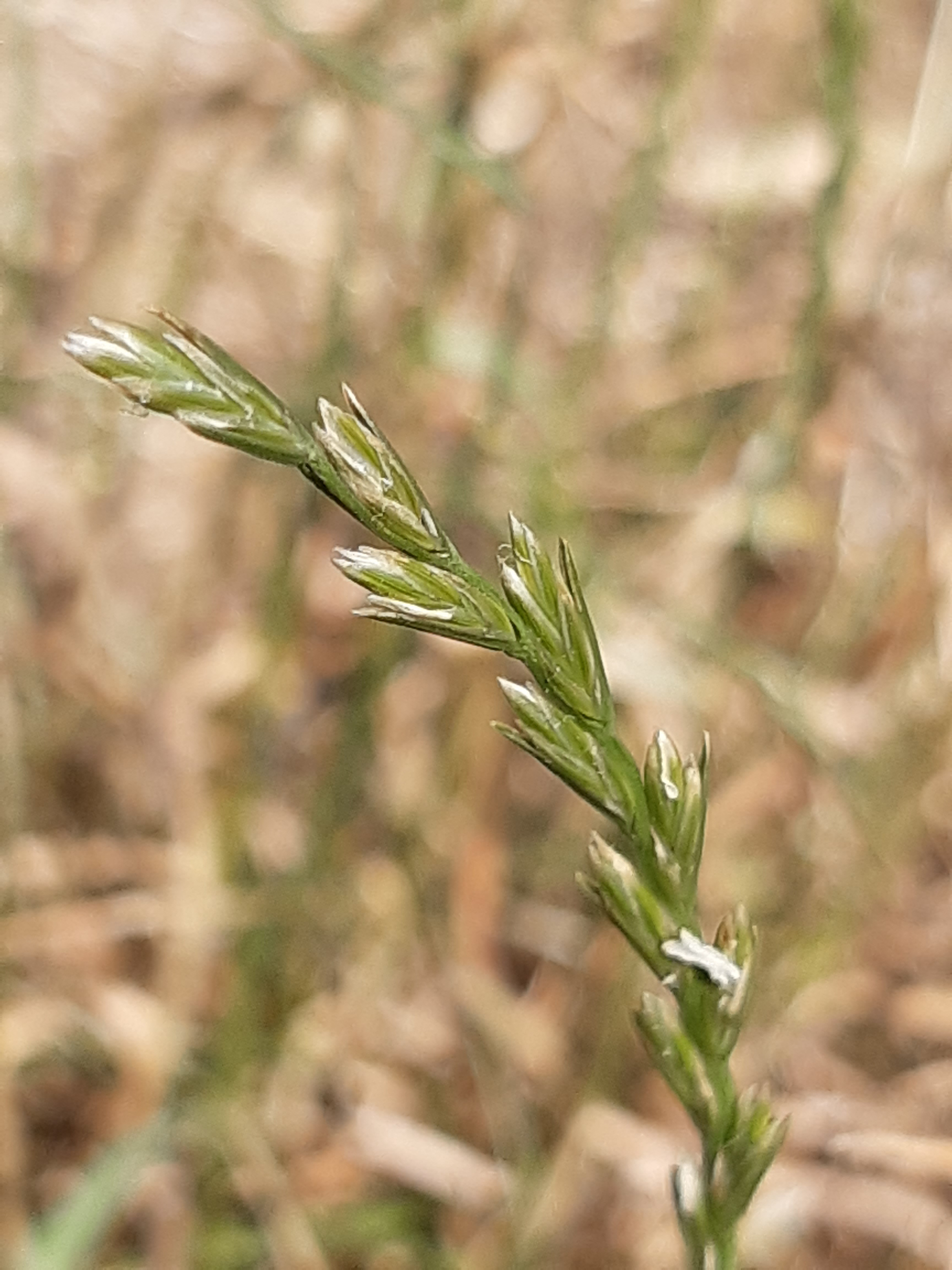
Perennial Ryegrass, Lolium perenne in acid grassland

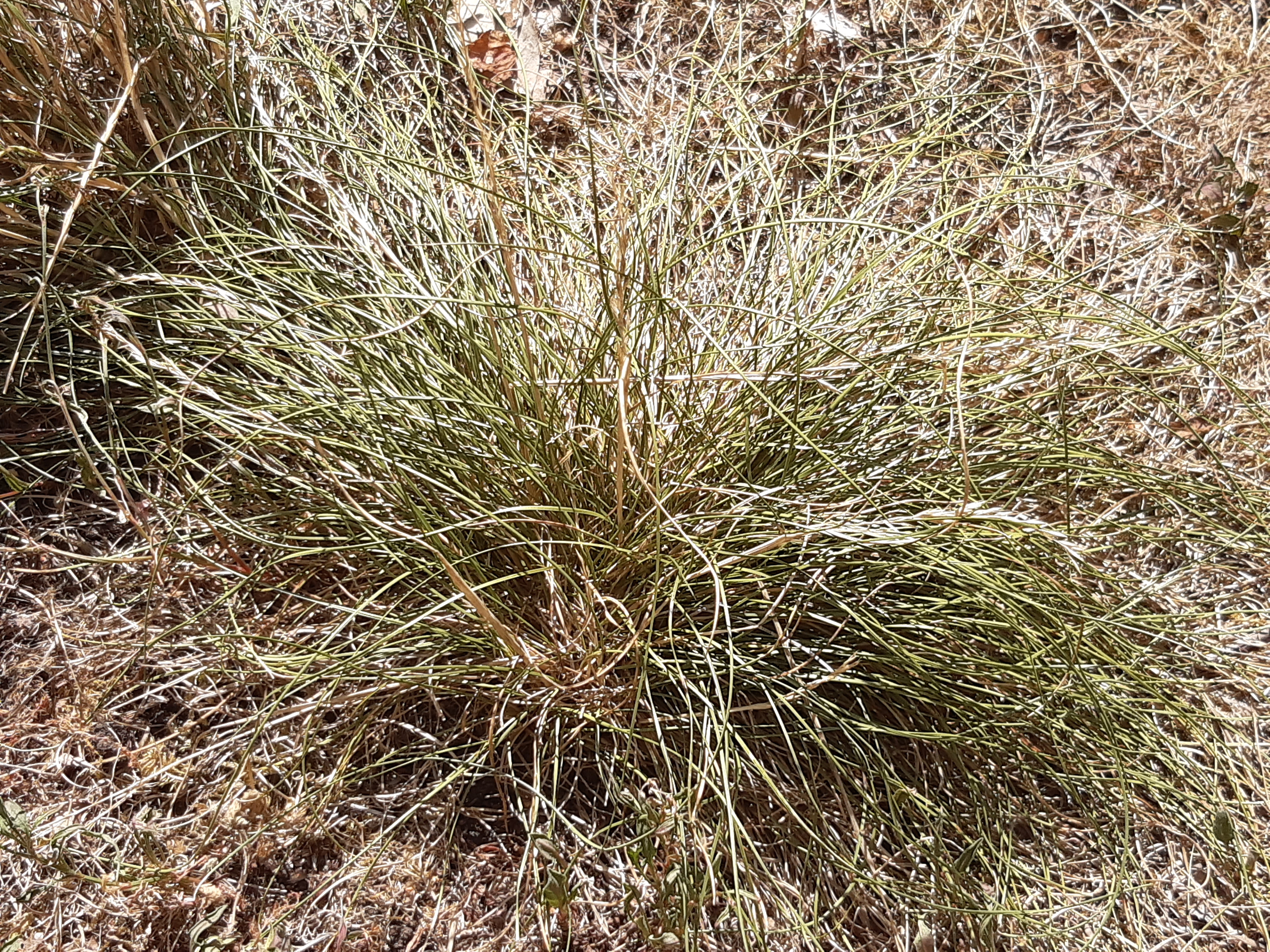
Sheep's Fescue, Festuca ovina, in acid grassland

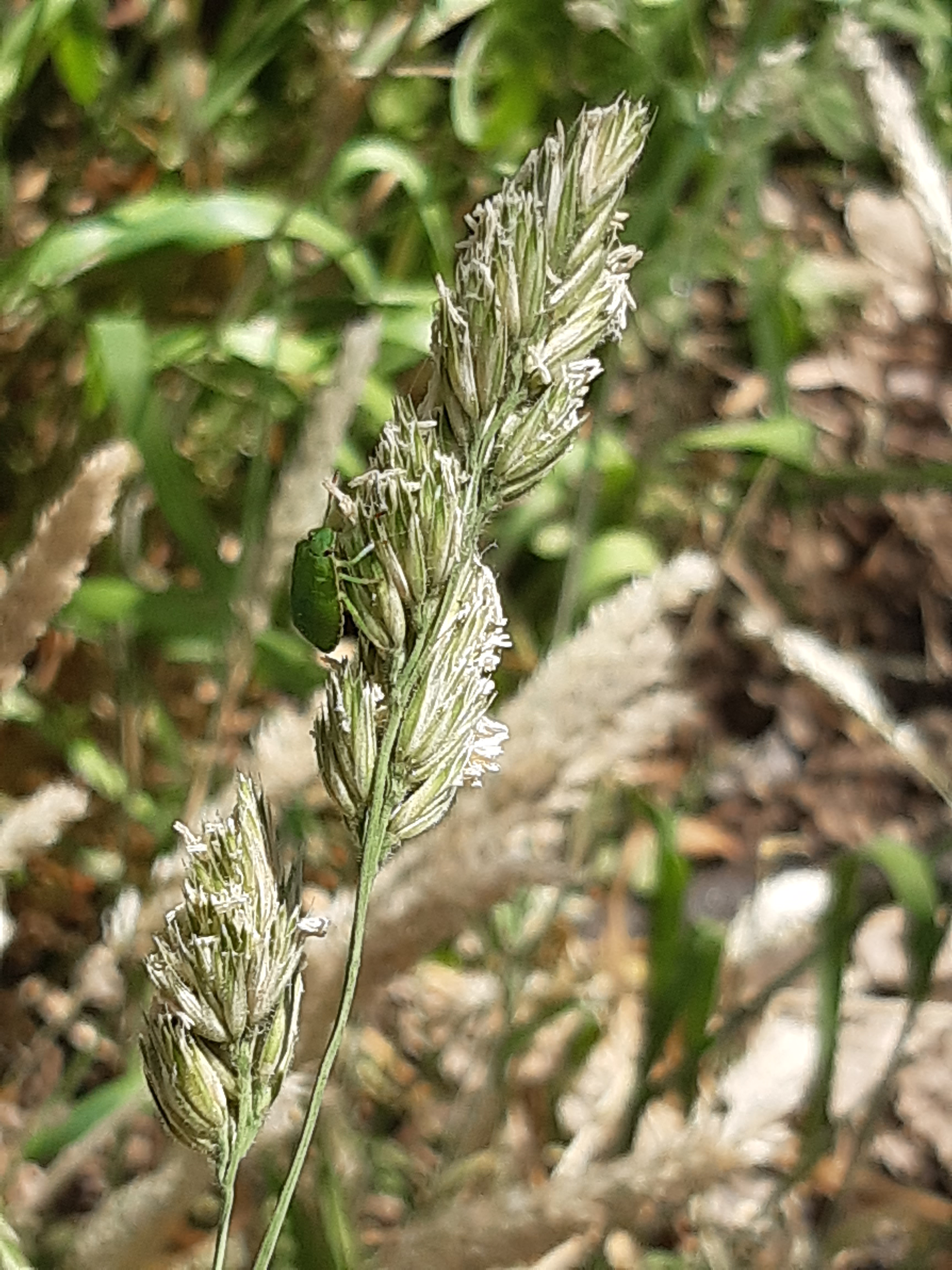
Cocksfoot Grass, Dactylis glomerata

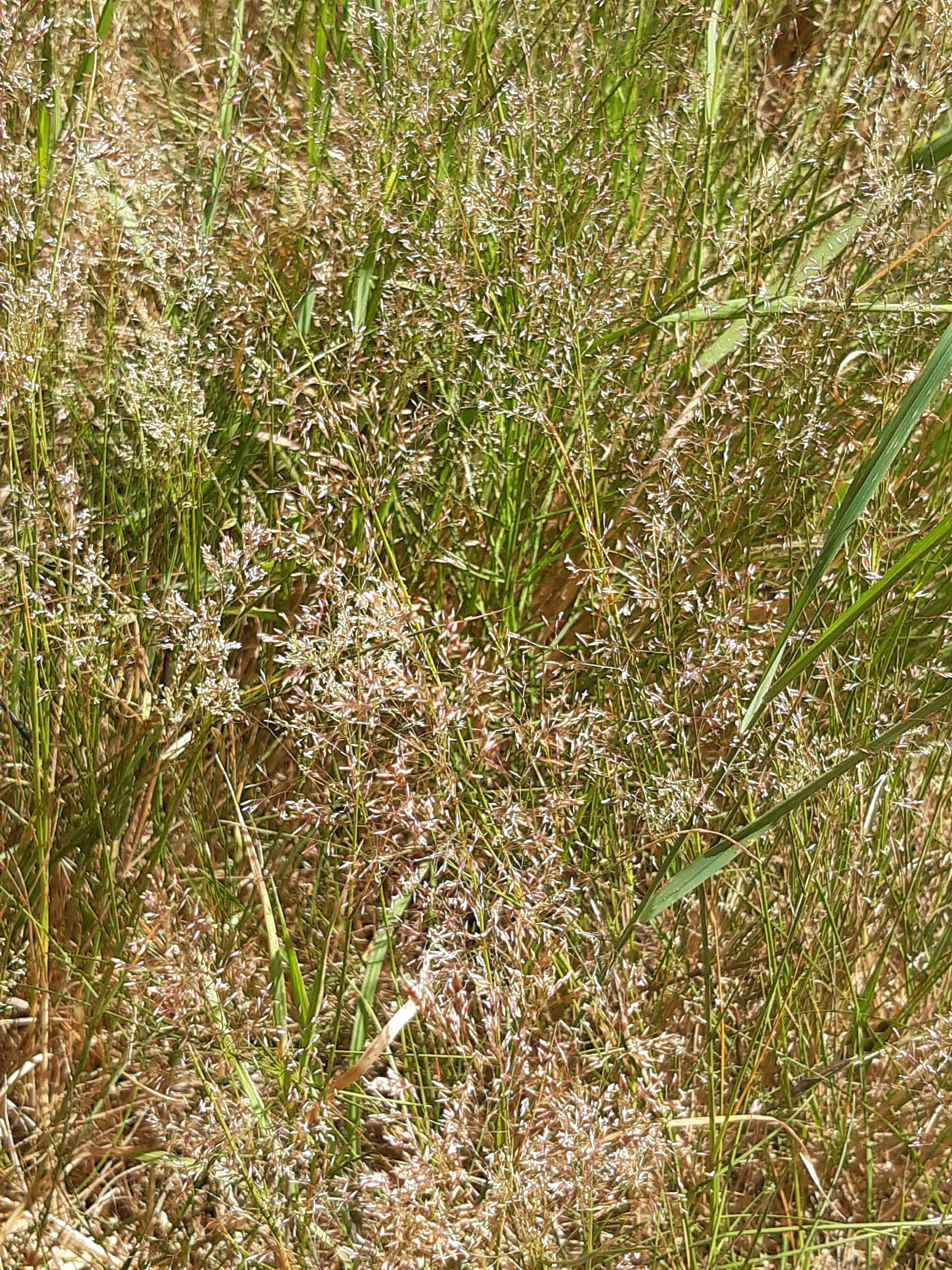
Common Bent, Agrostis capillaris, in Small Meadow

Reeds, Phragmites australis, in main pond

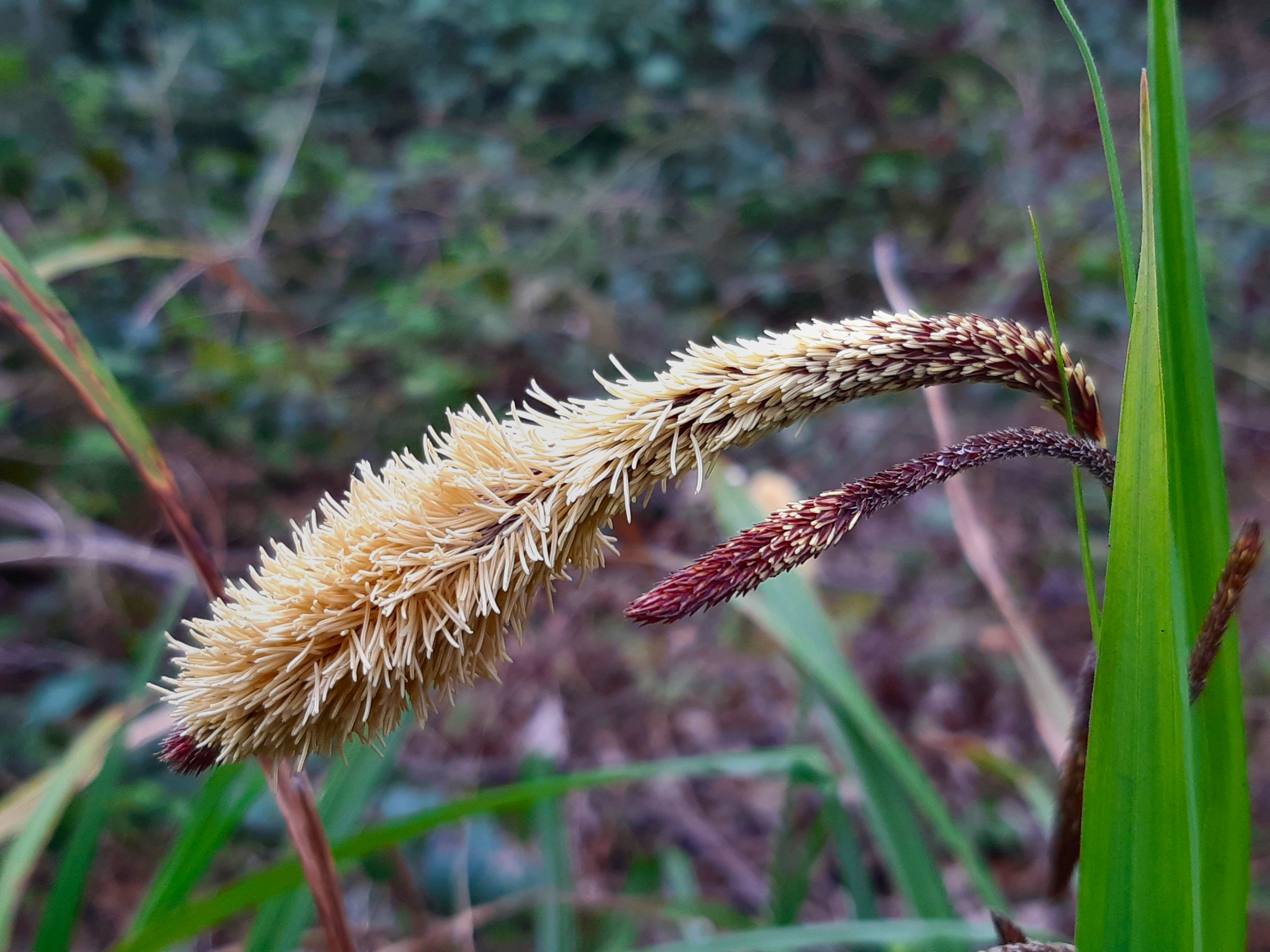
Pendulous sedge, Carex pendula, in flower

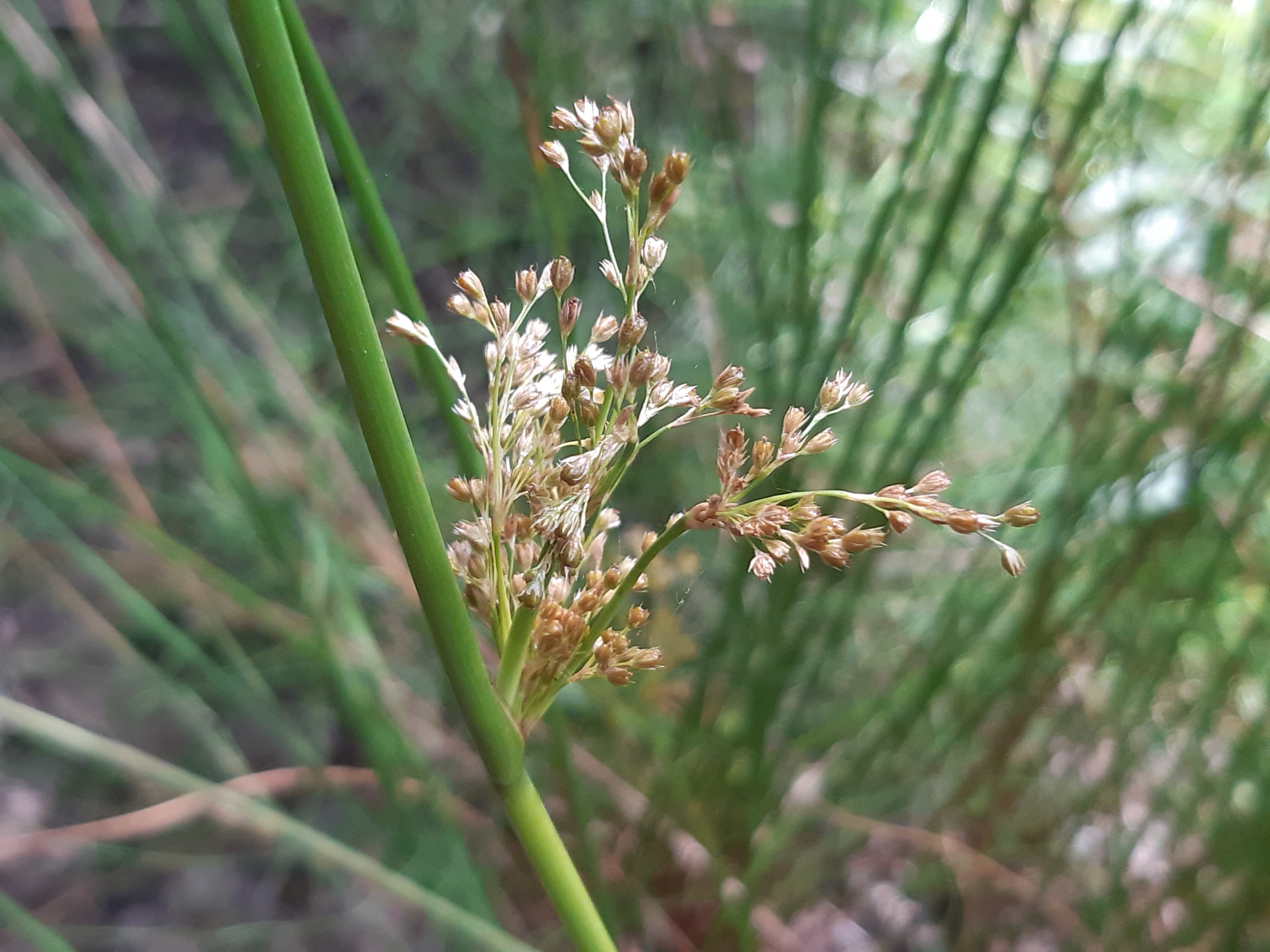
Soft rush, Juncus effusus, in Wet Woodland

Trees
Trees (bark)

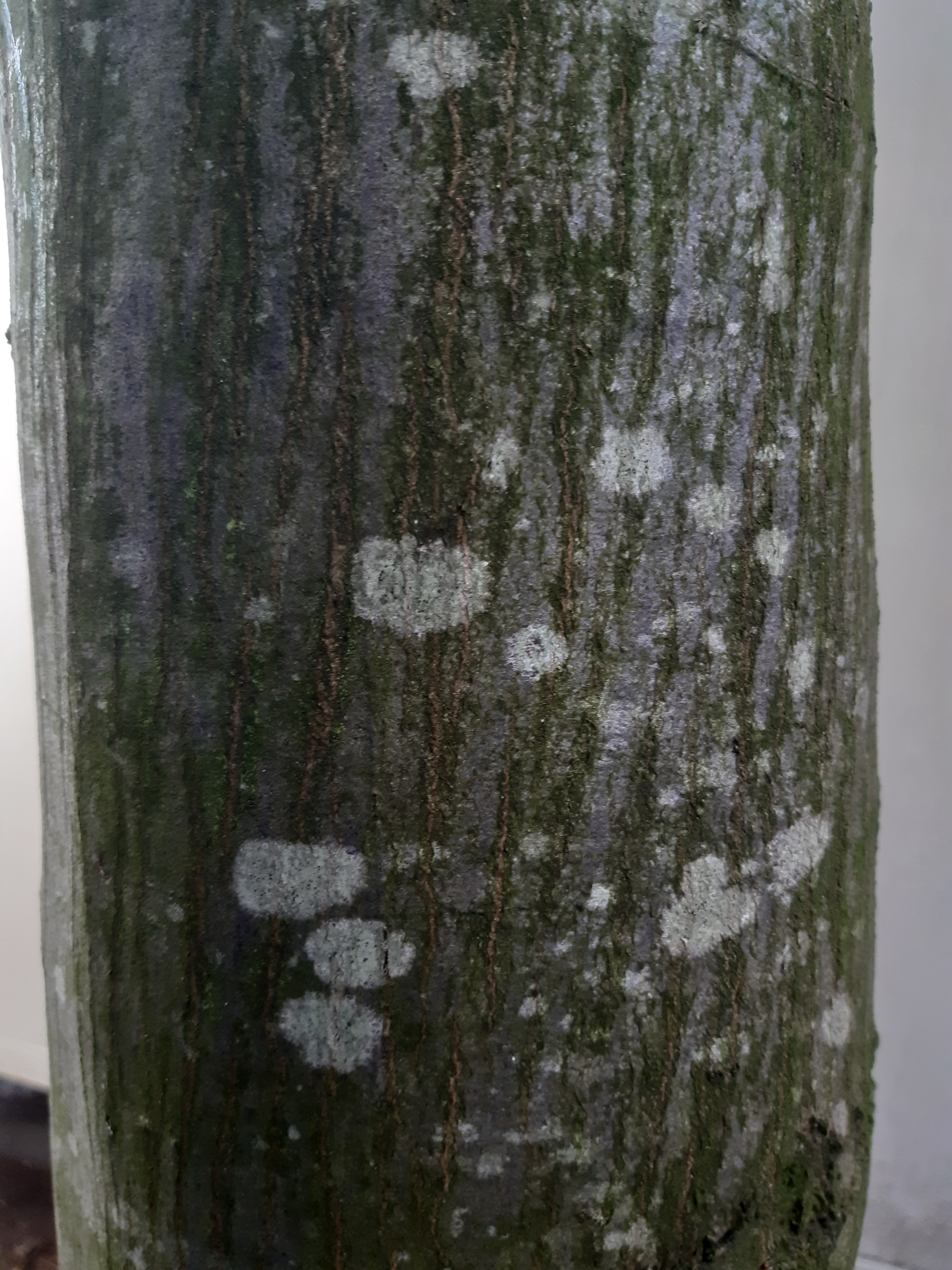
Hornbeam

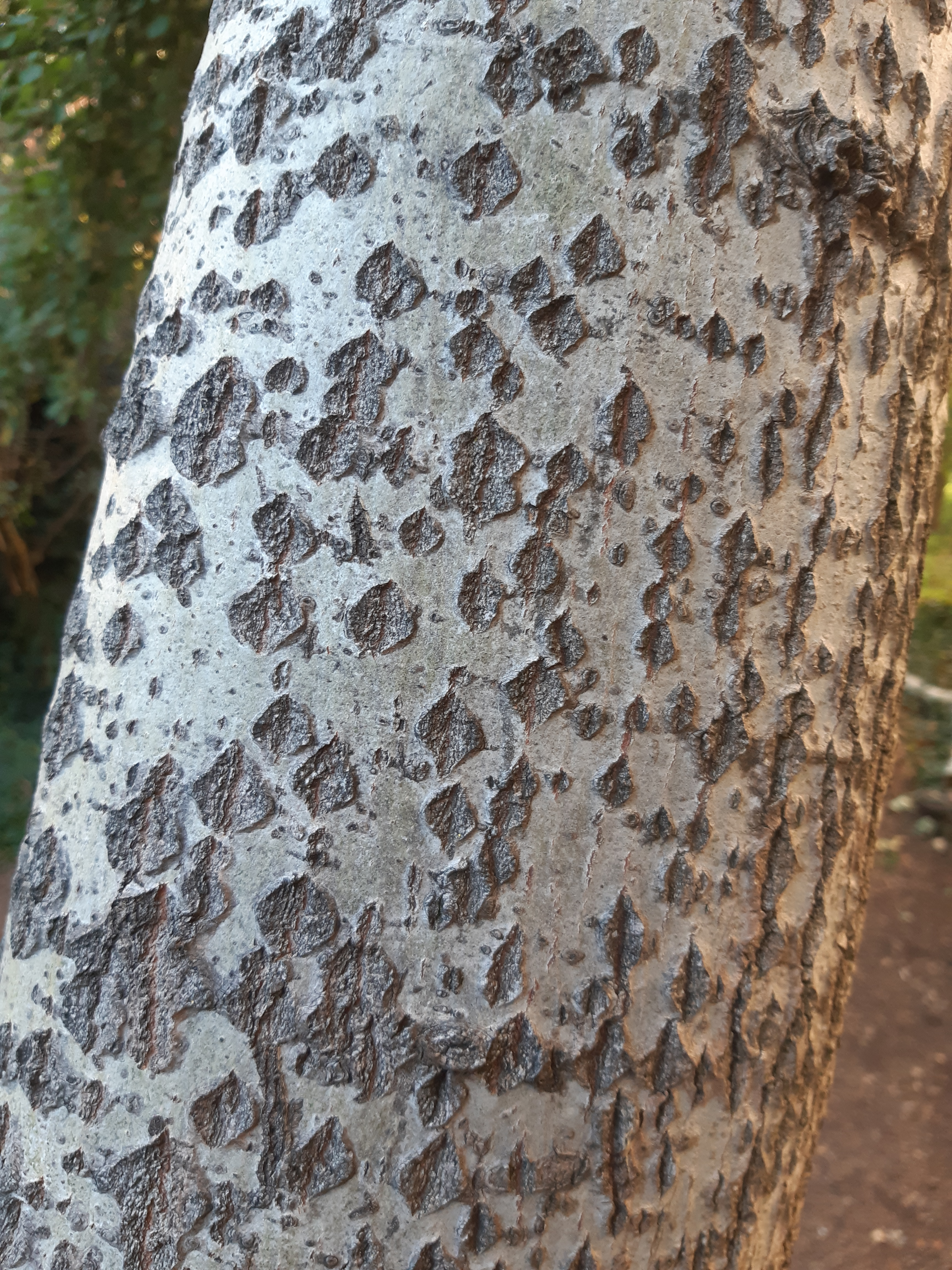
Grey Poplar

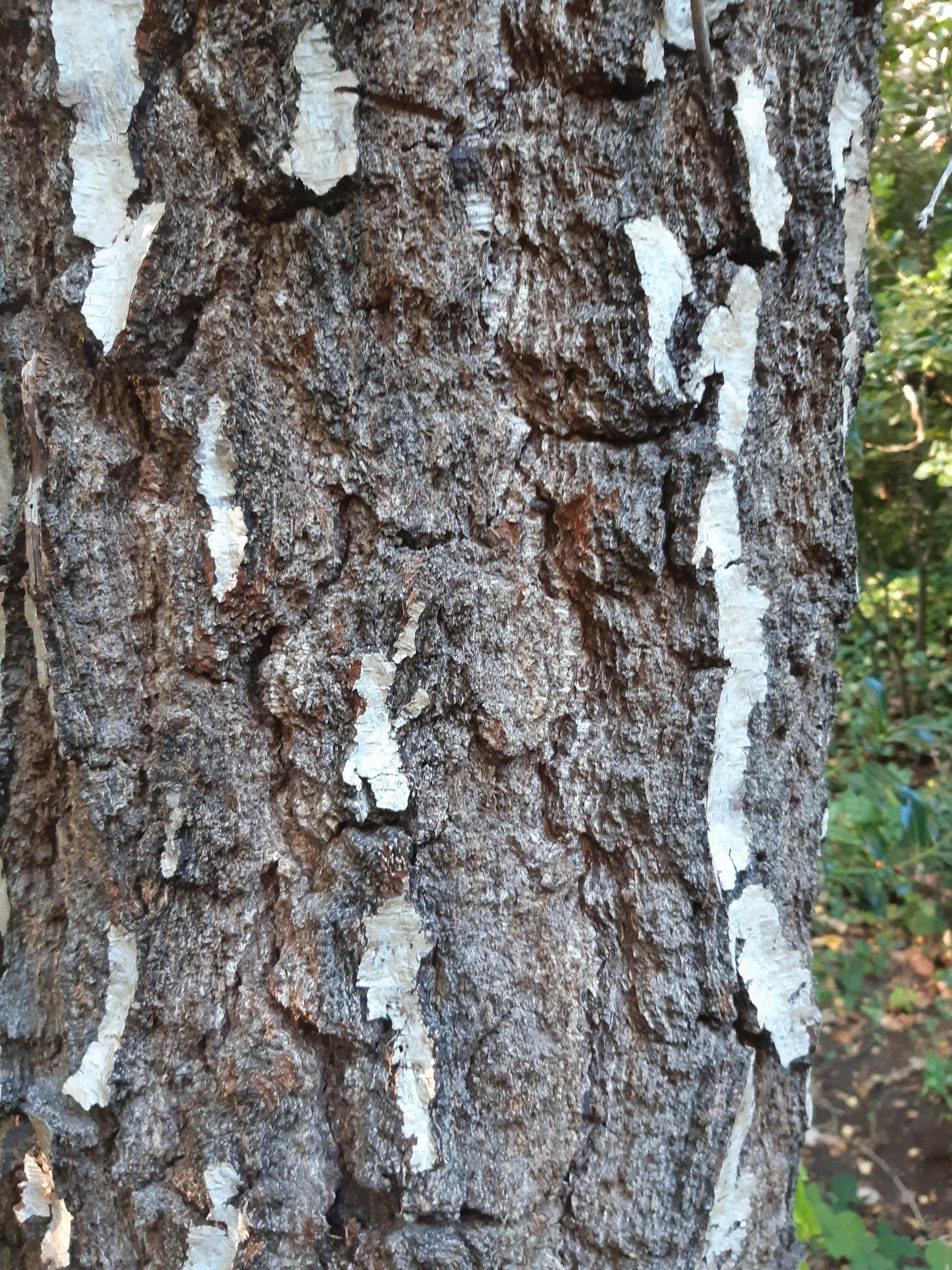
Birch

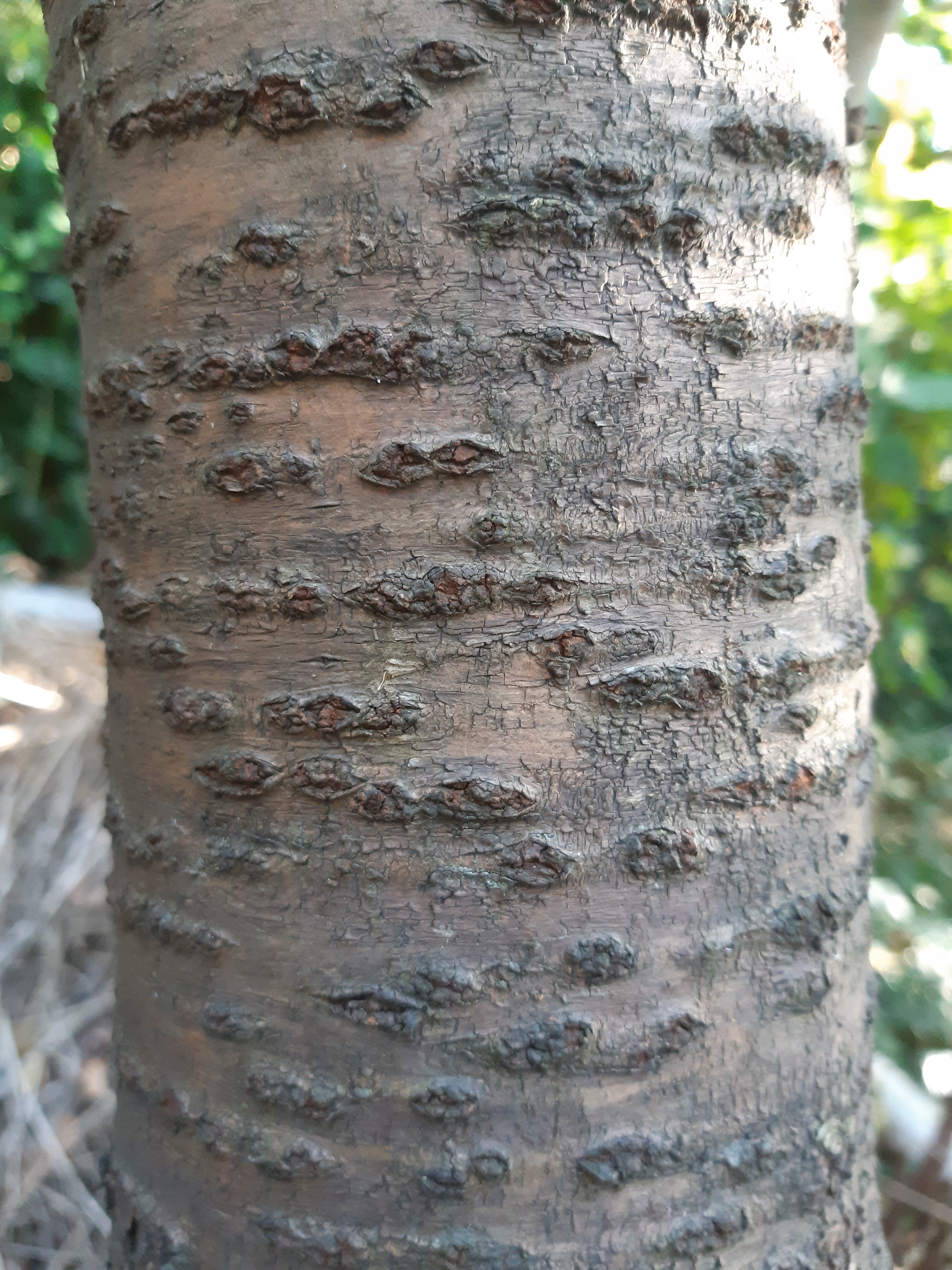
Bird cherry

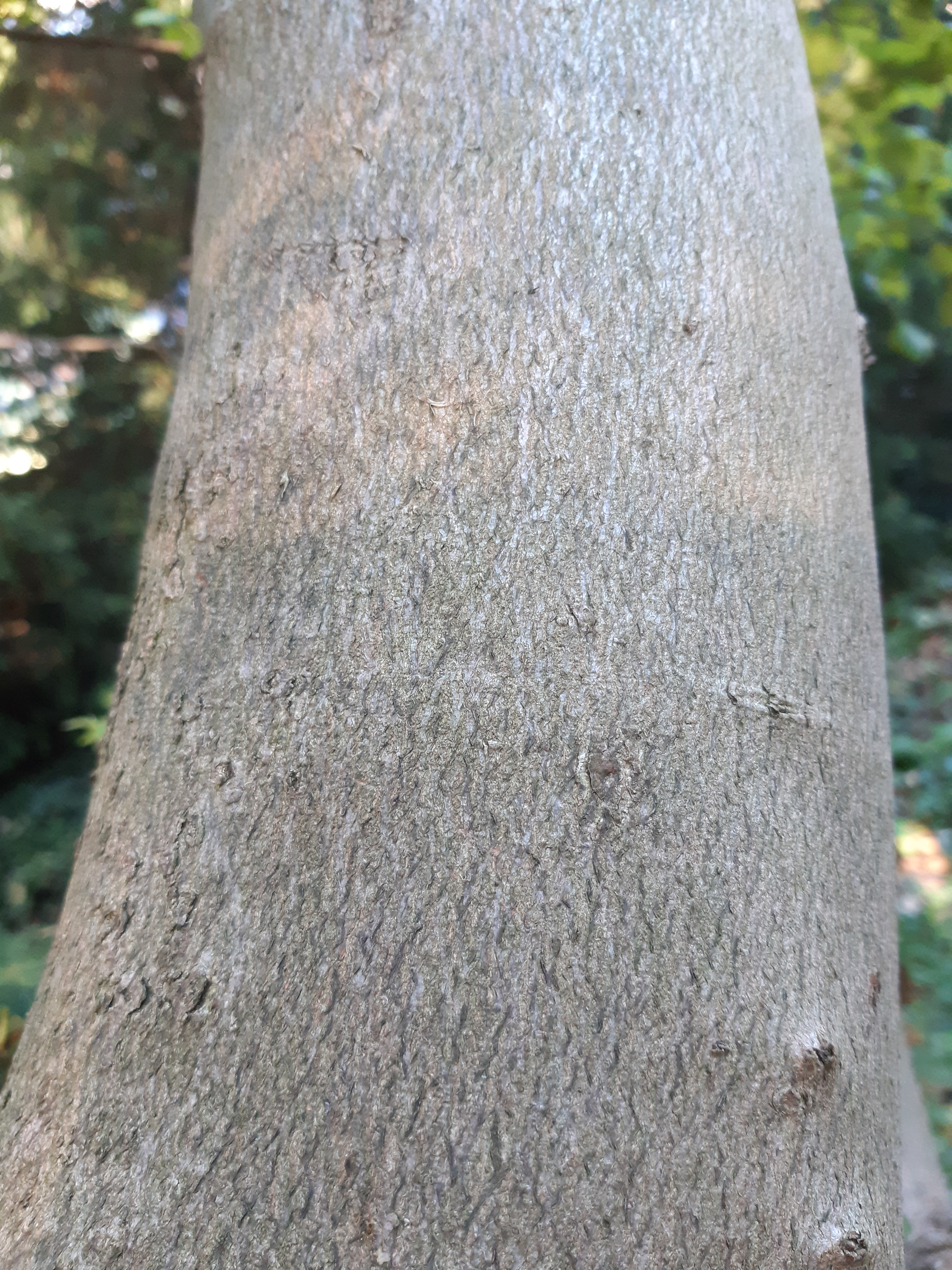
Sycamore

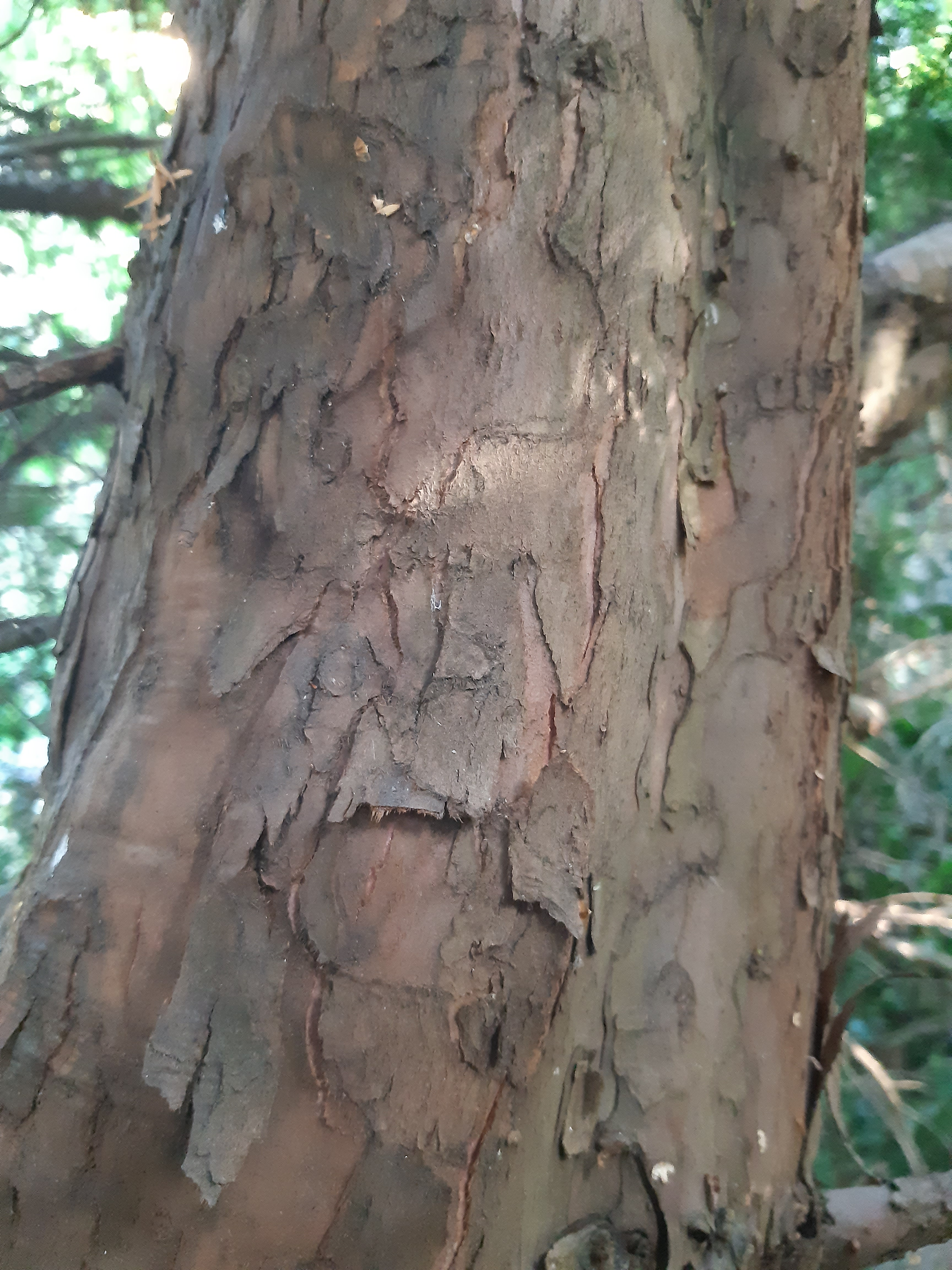
Yew

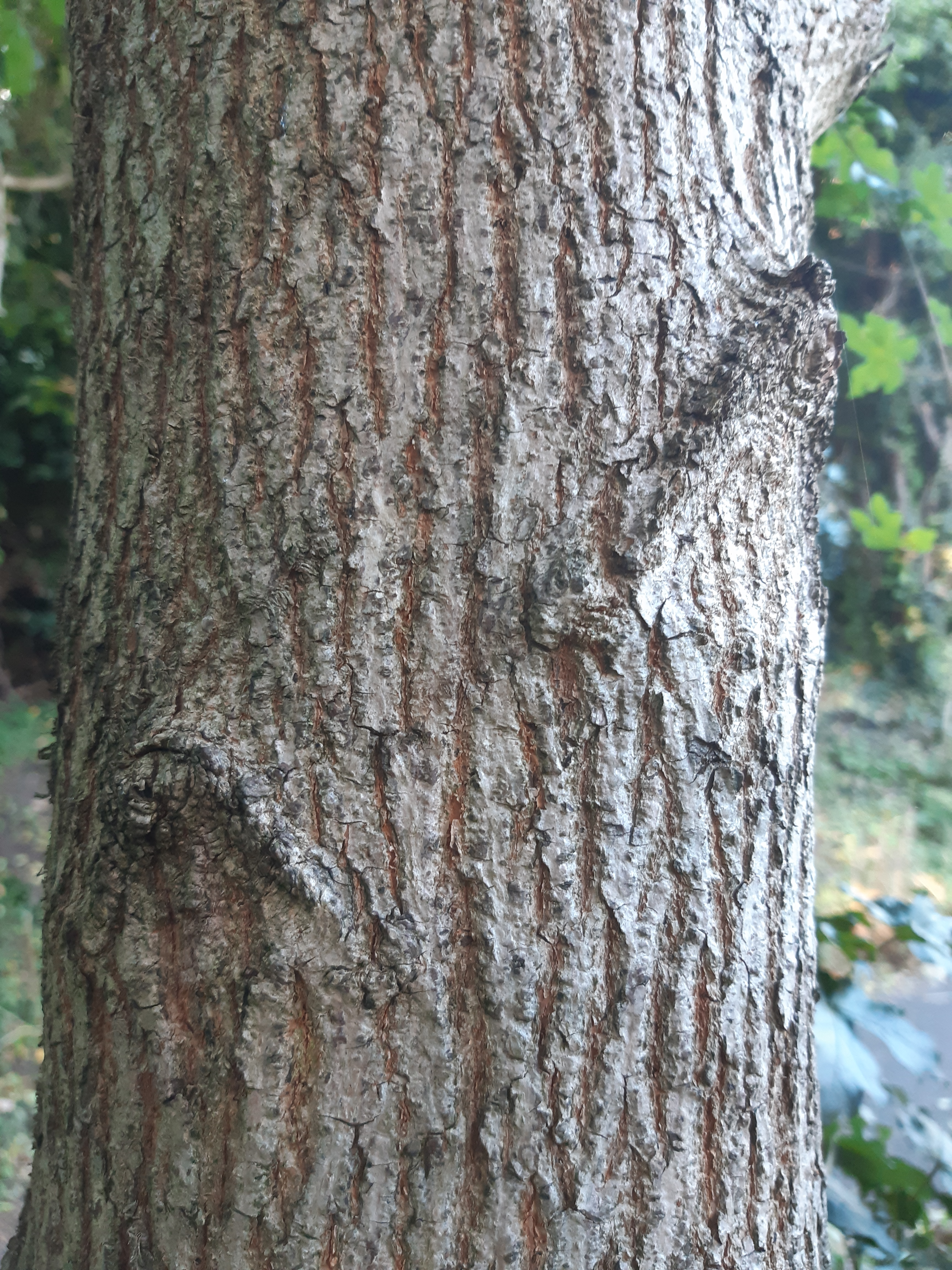
Field Maple

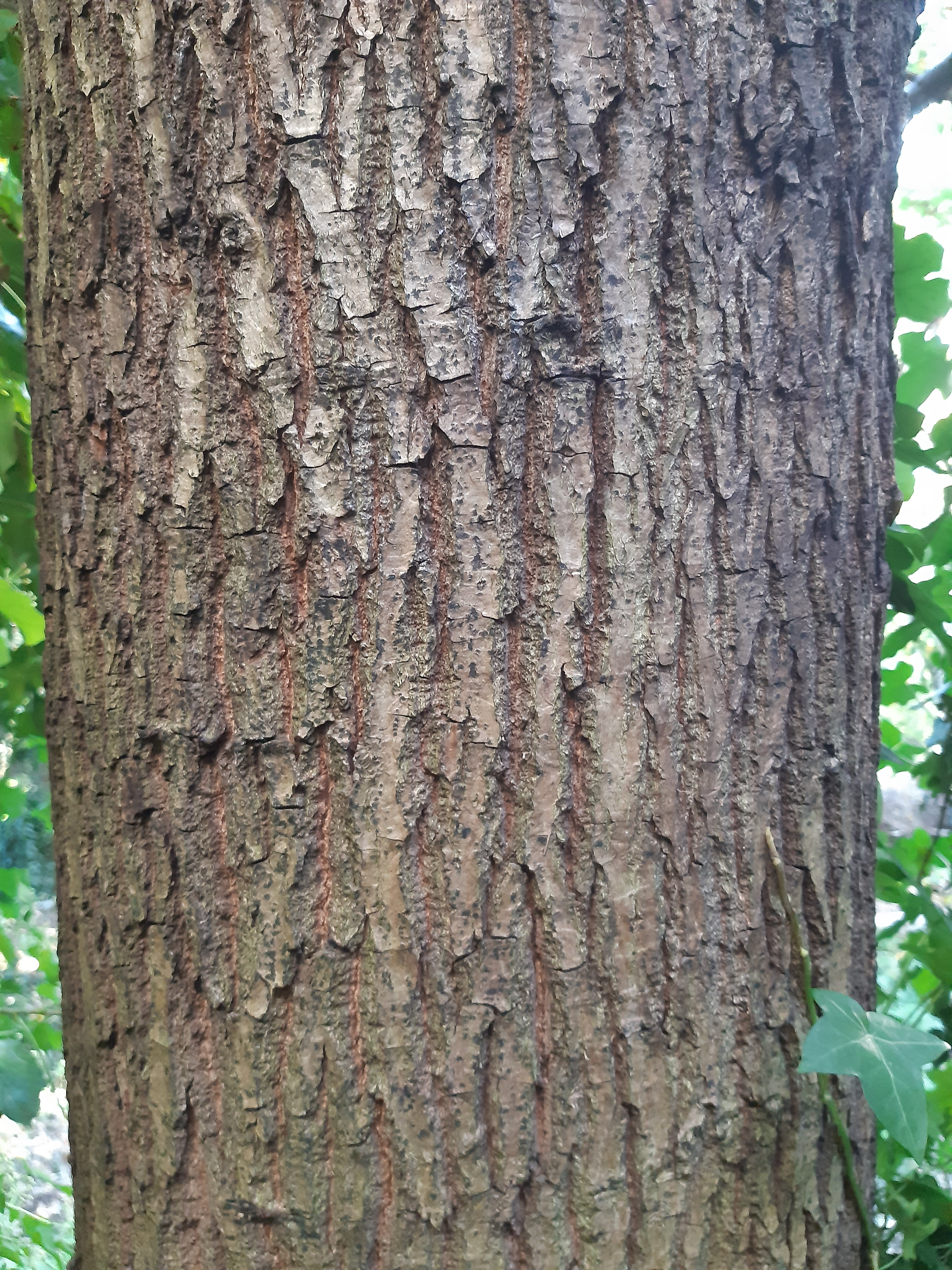
Pedunculate Oak

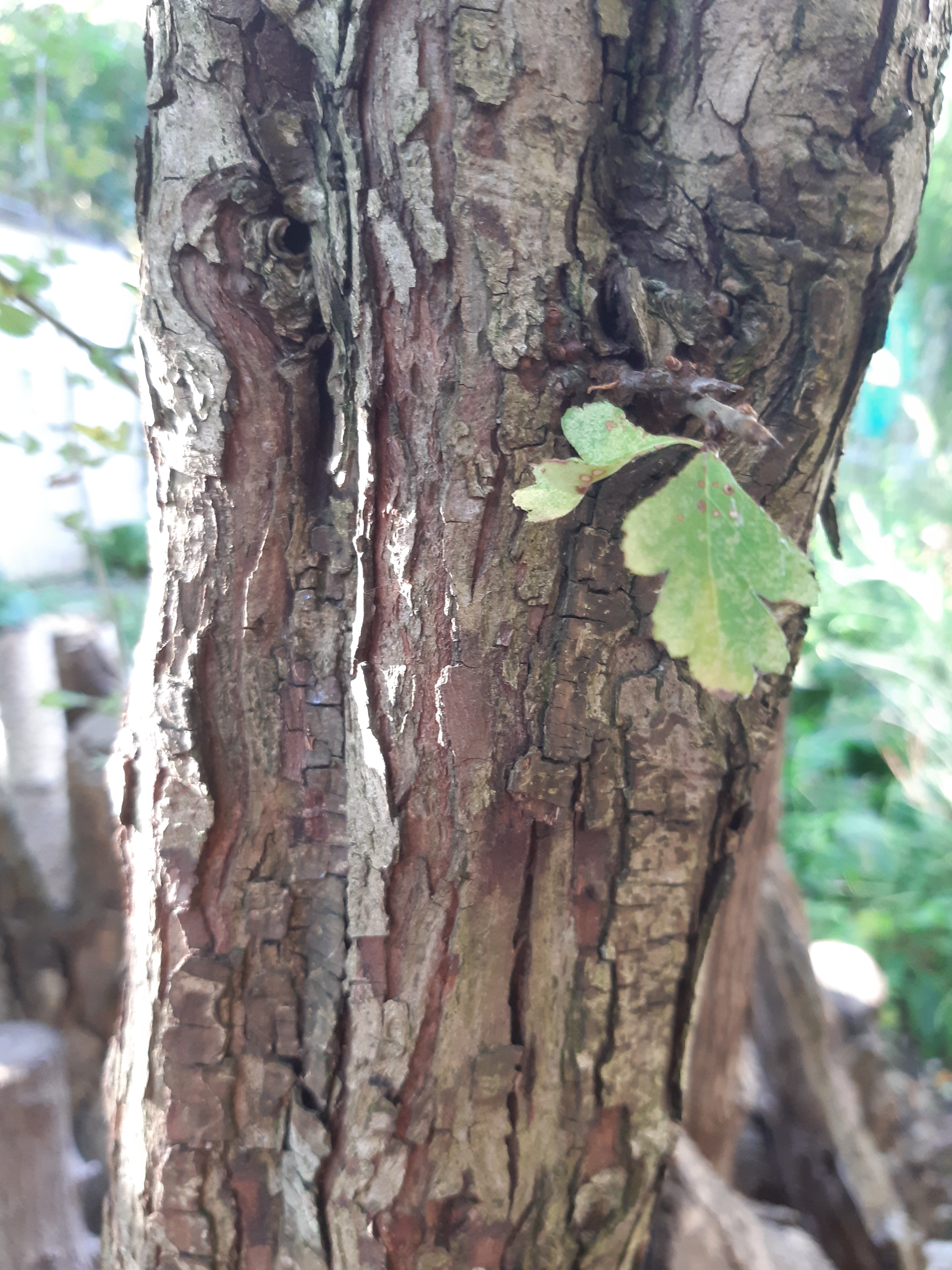
Hawthorn

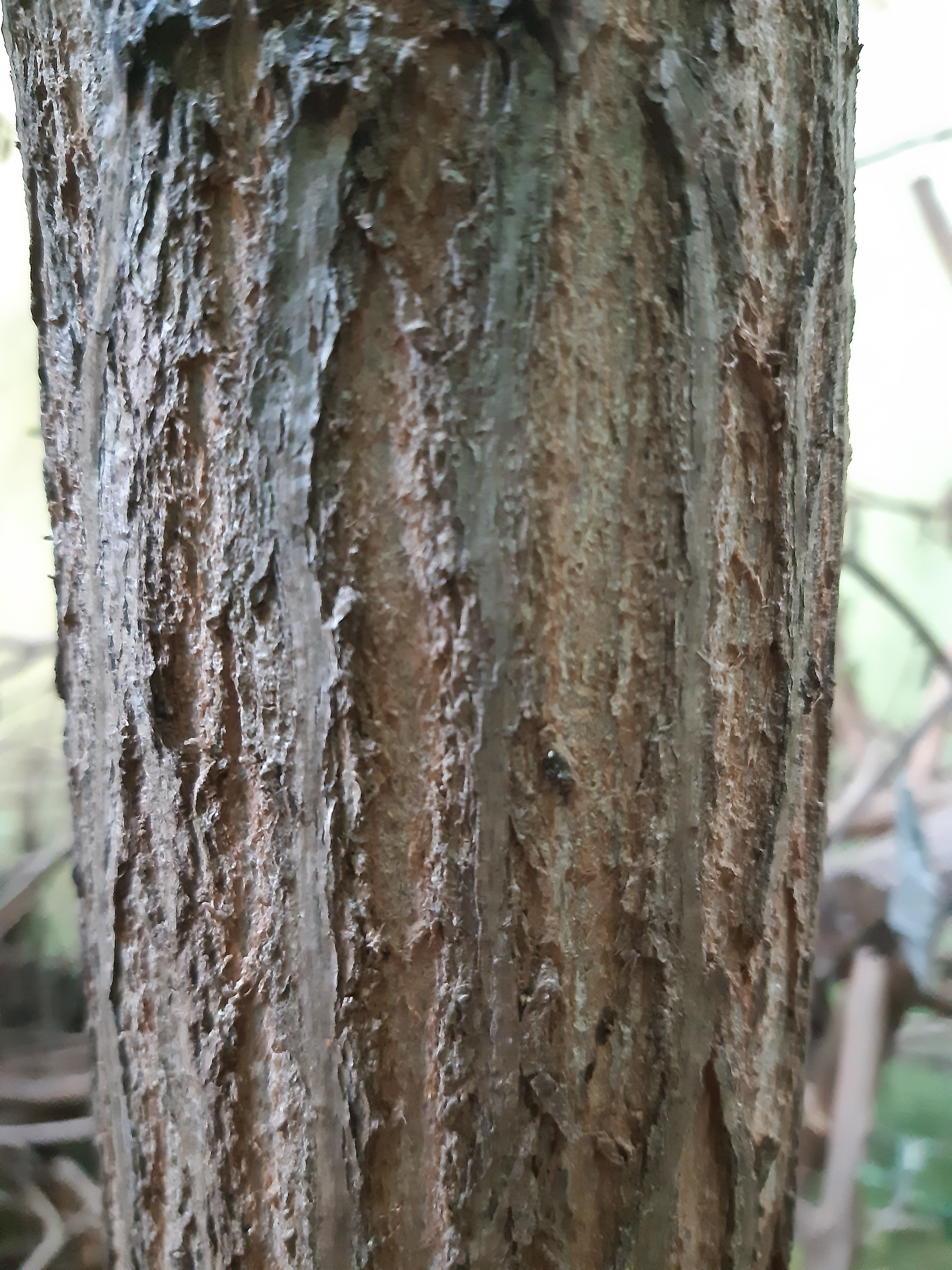
False Acacia

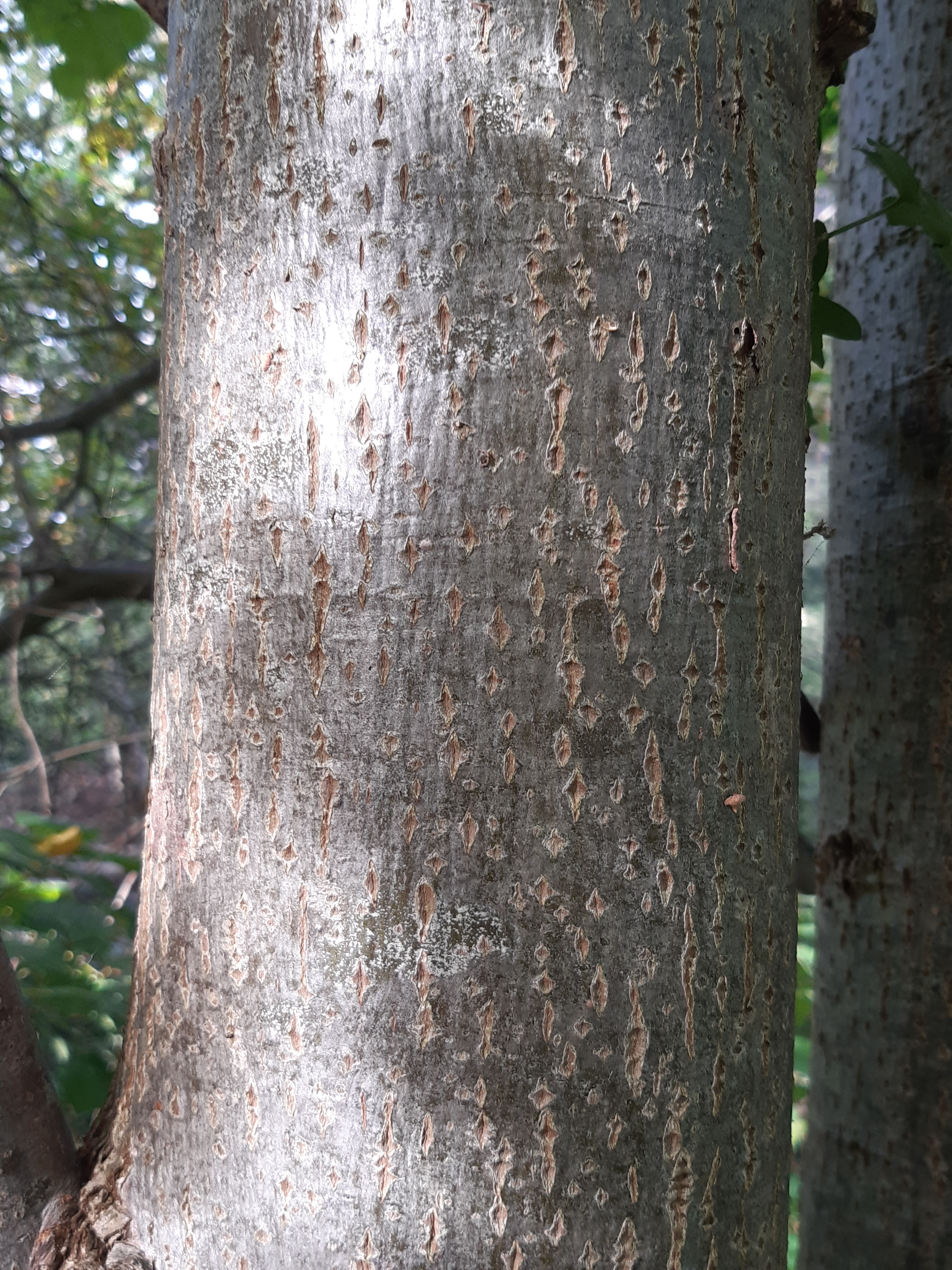
Small-leaved Lime

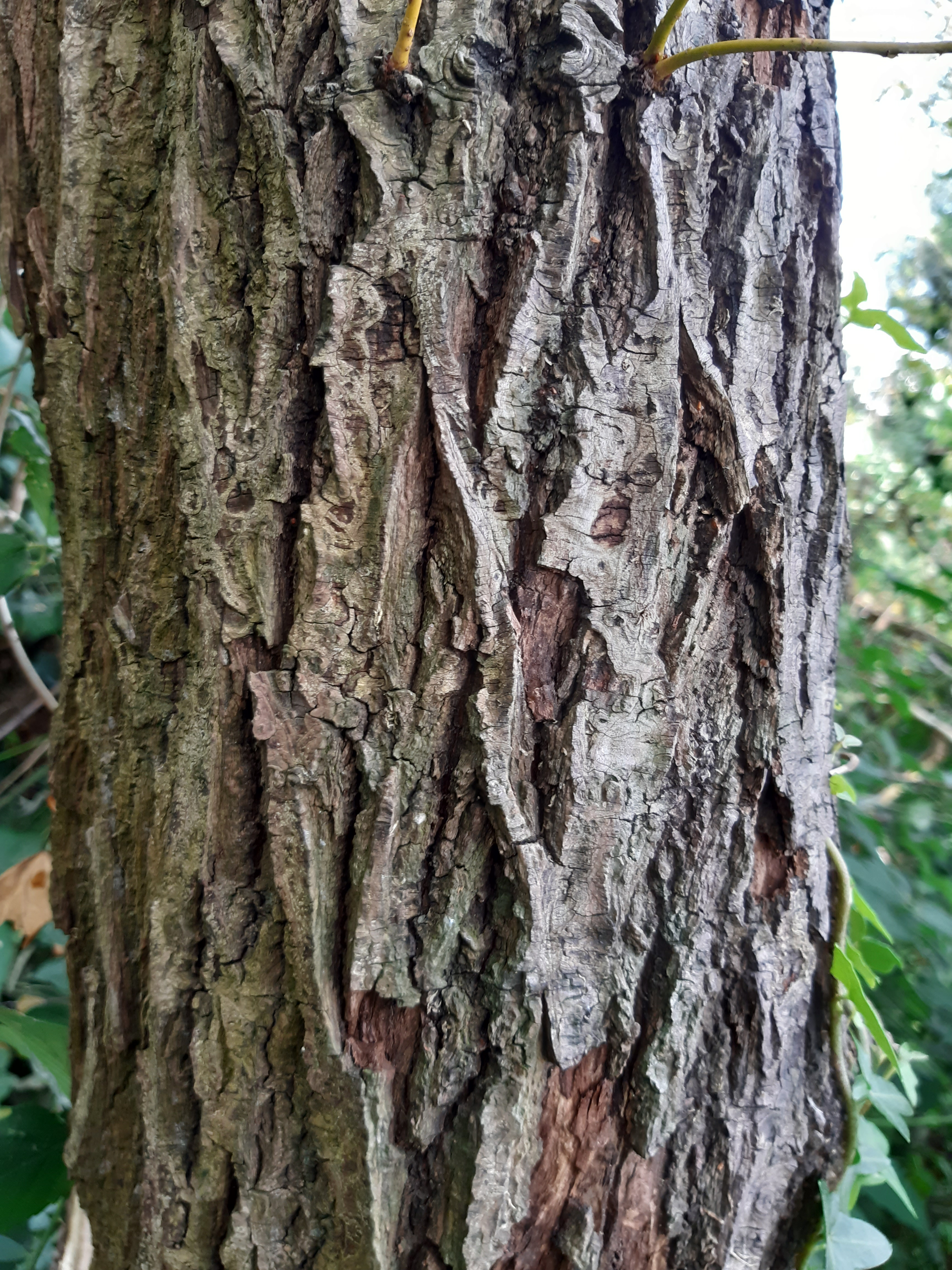
Willow

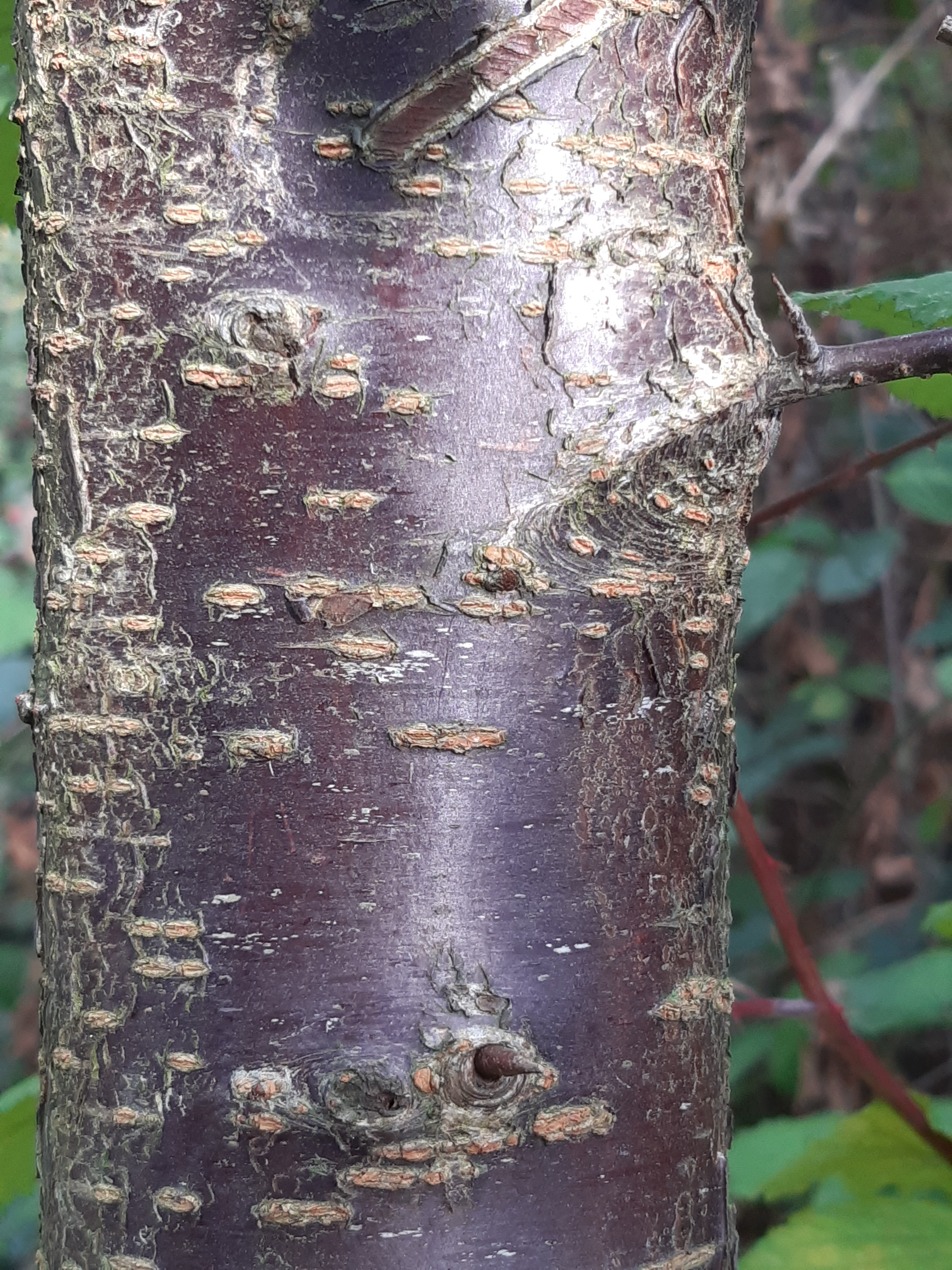
Cherry Plum

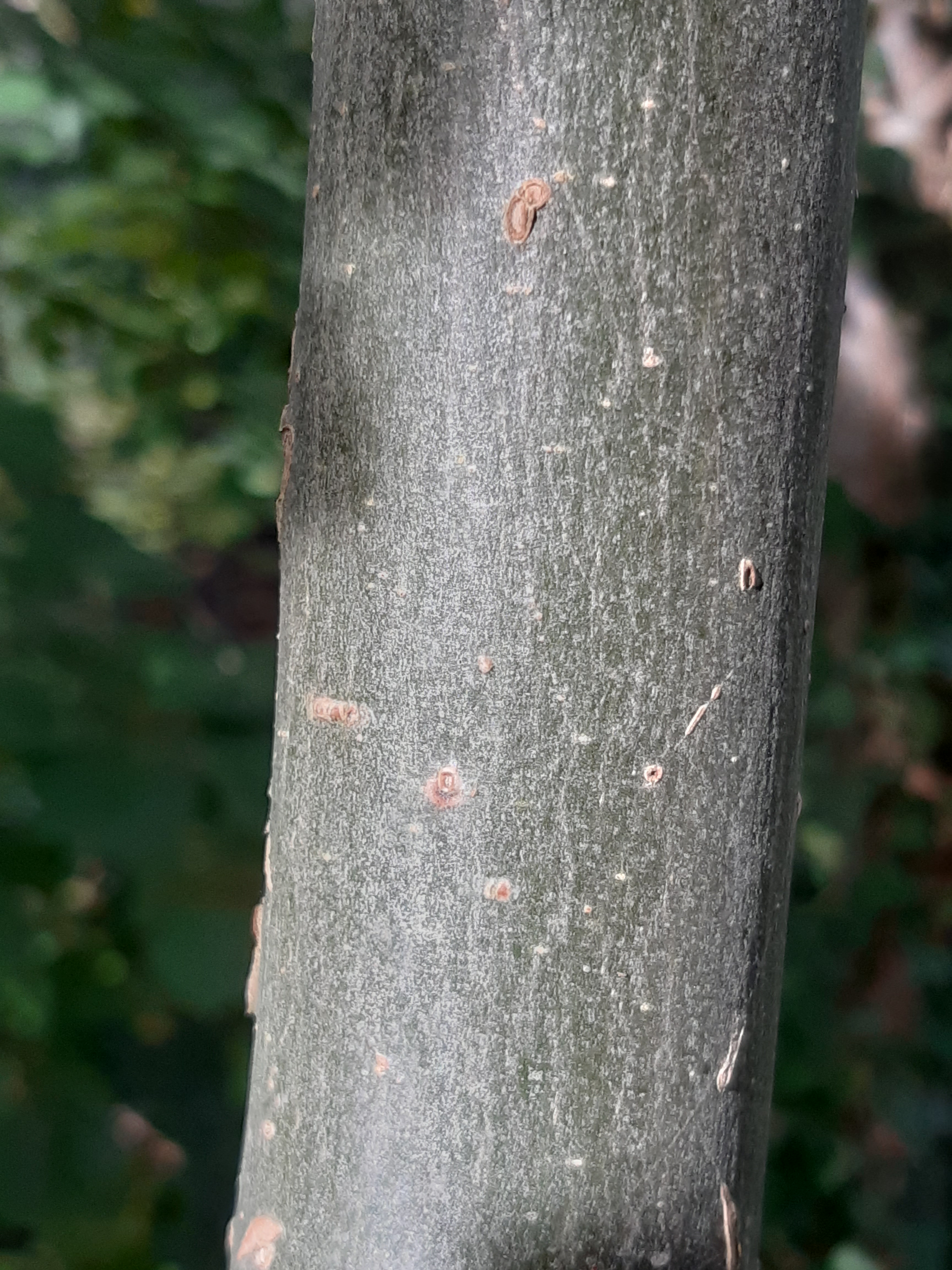
Ash

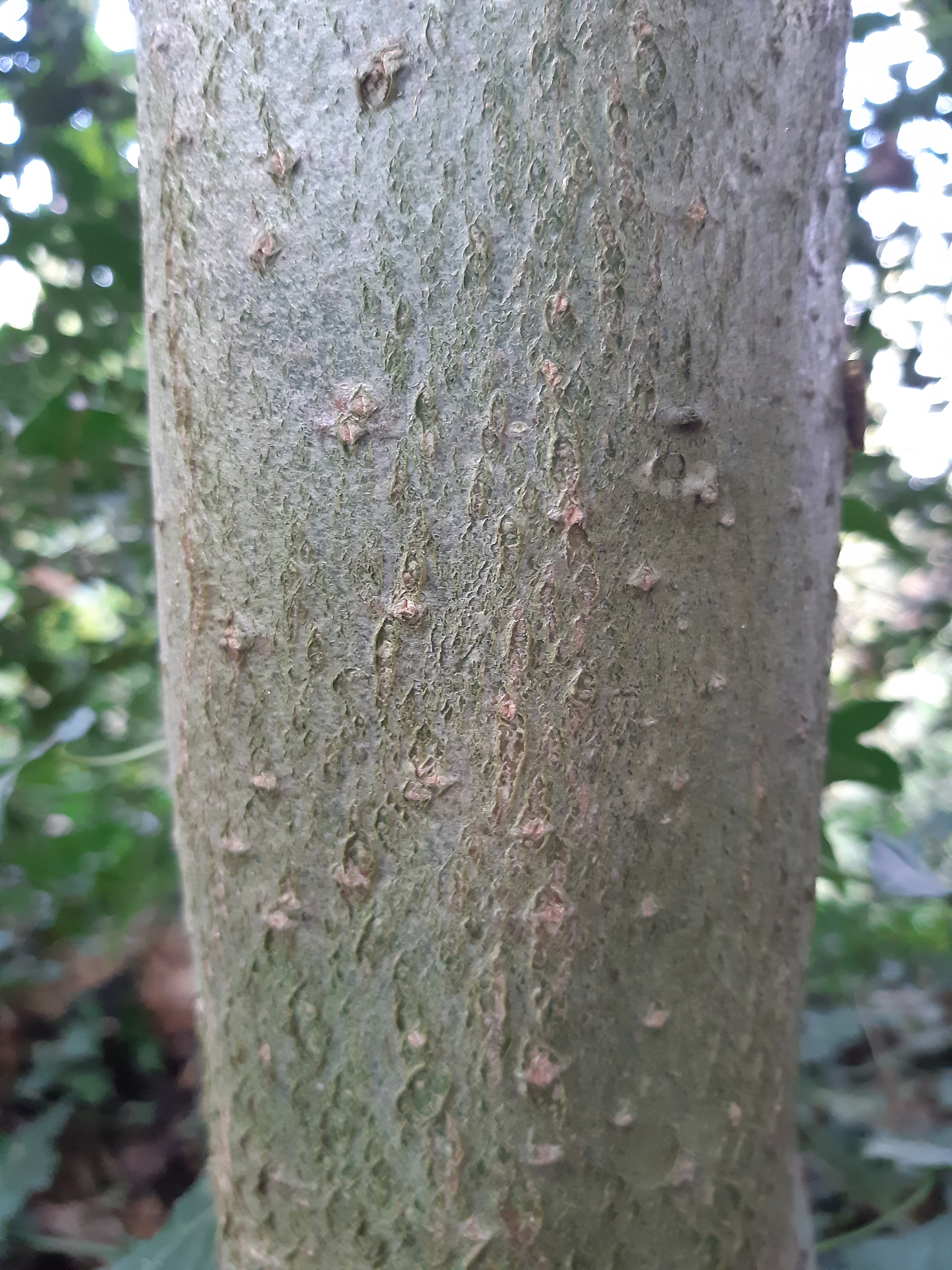
Holly

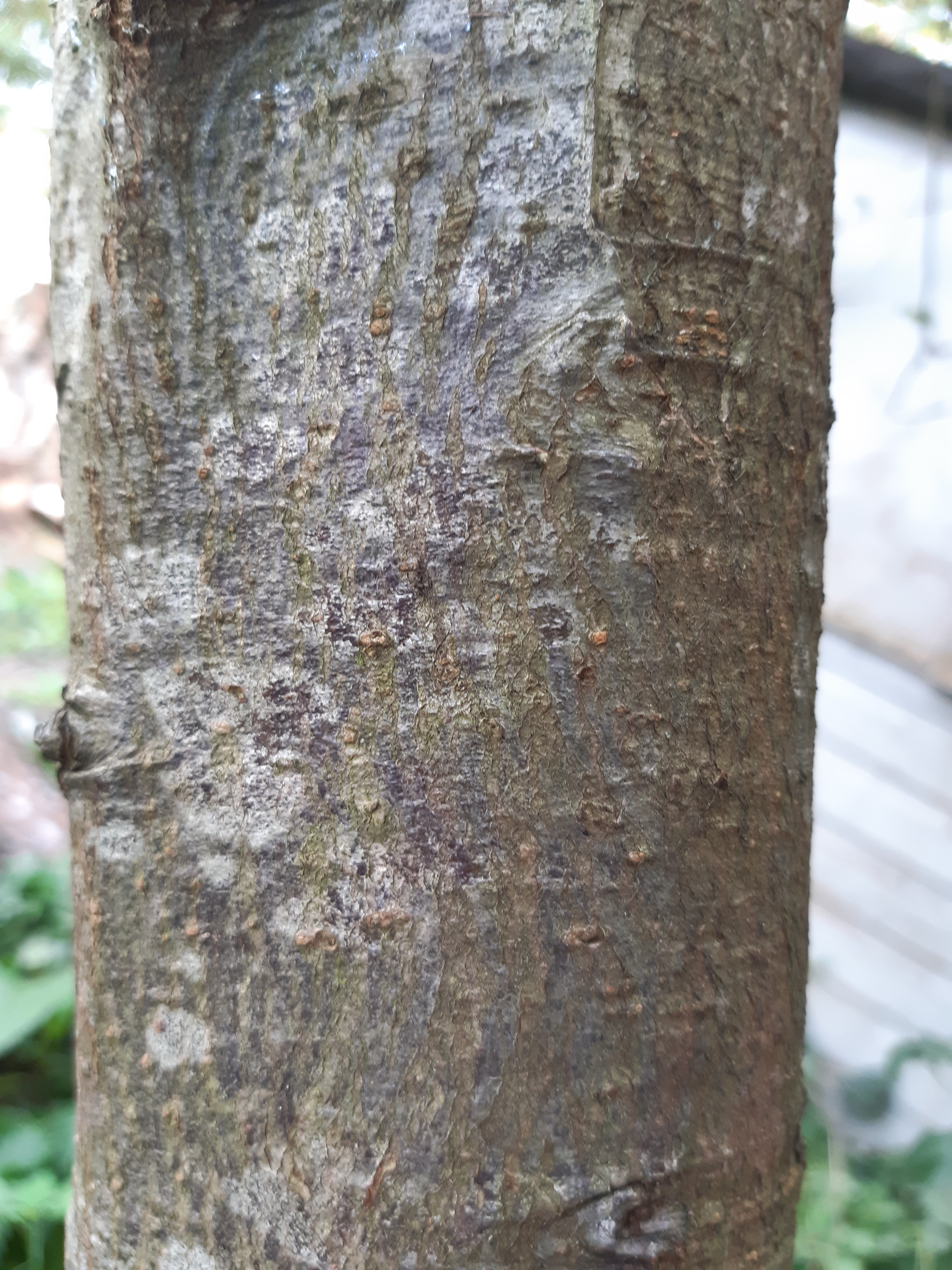
Apple

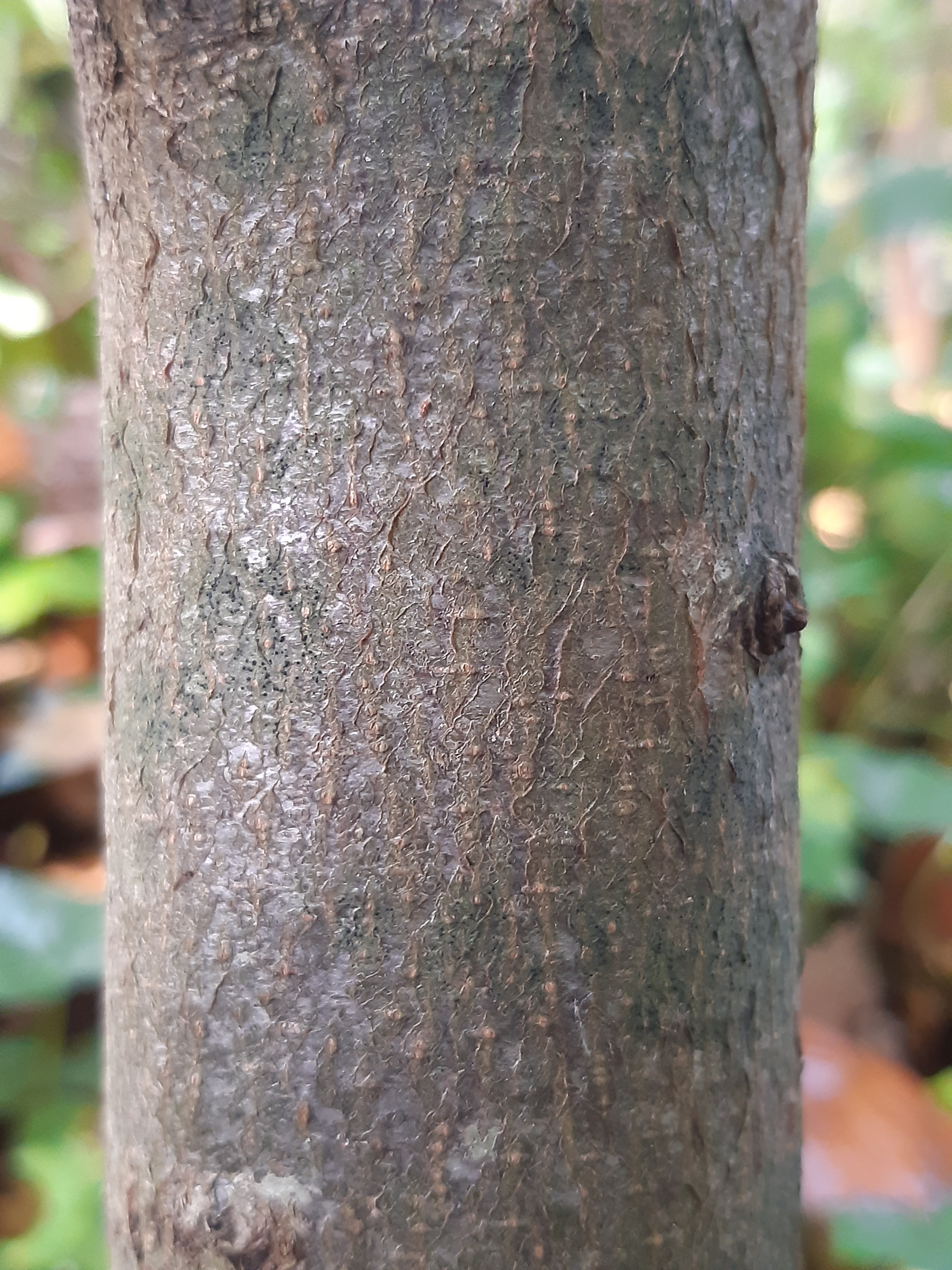
Beech

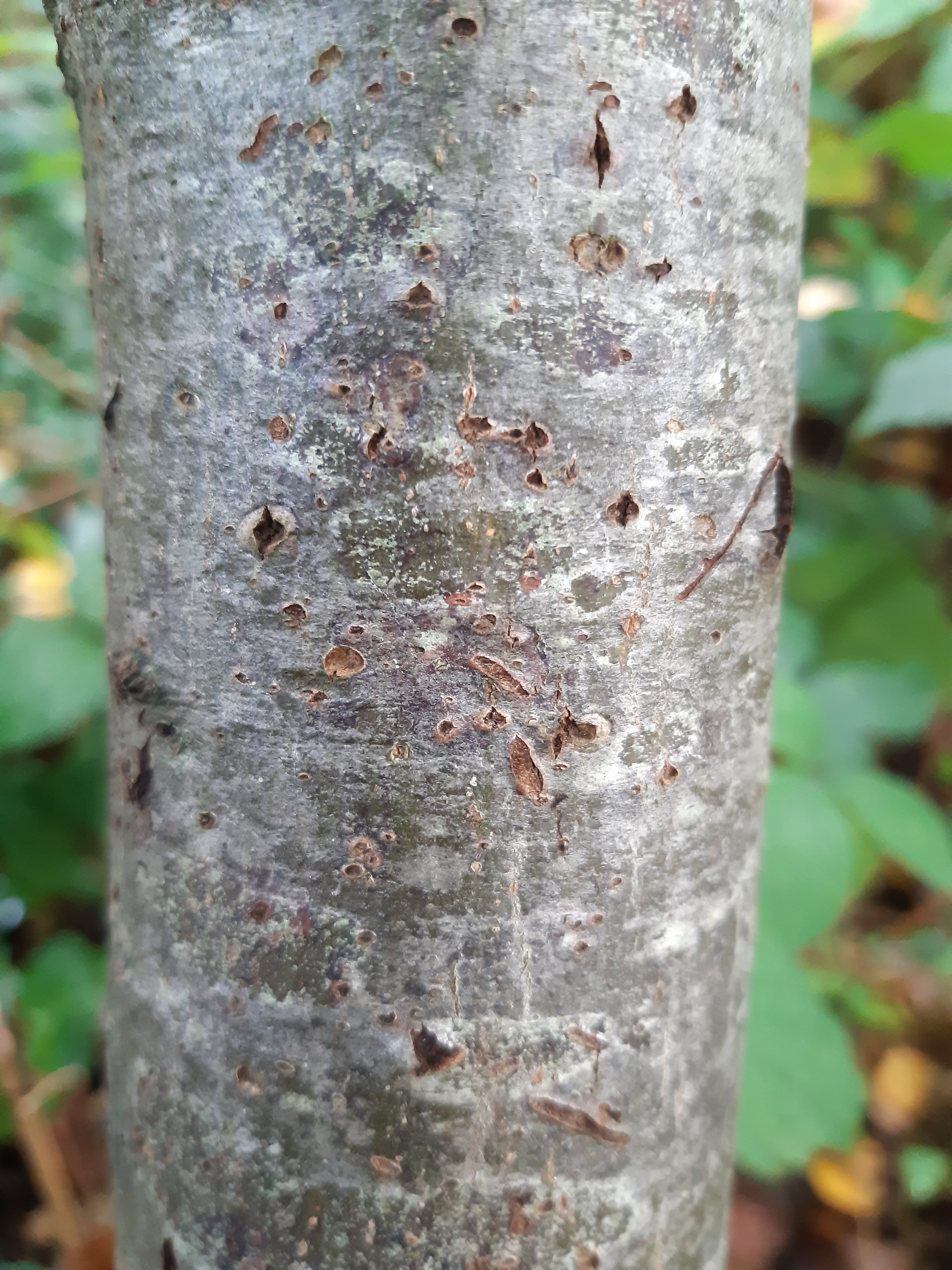
Chestnut

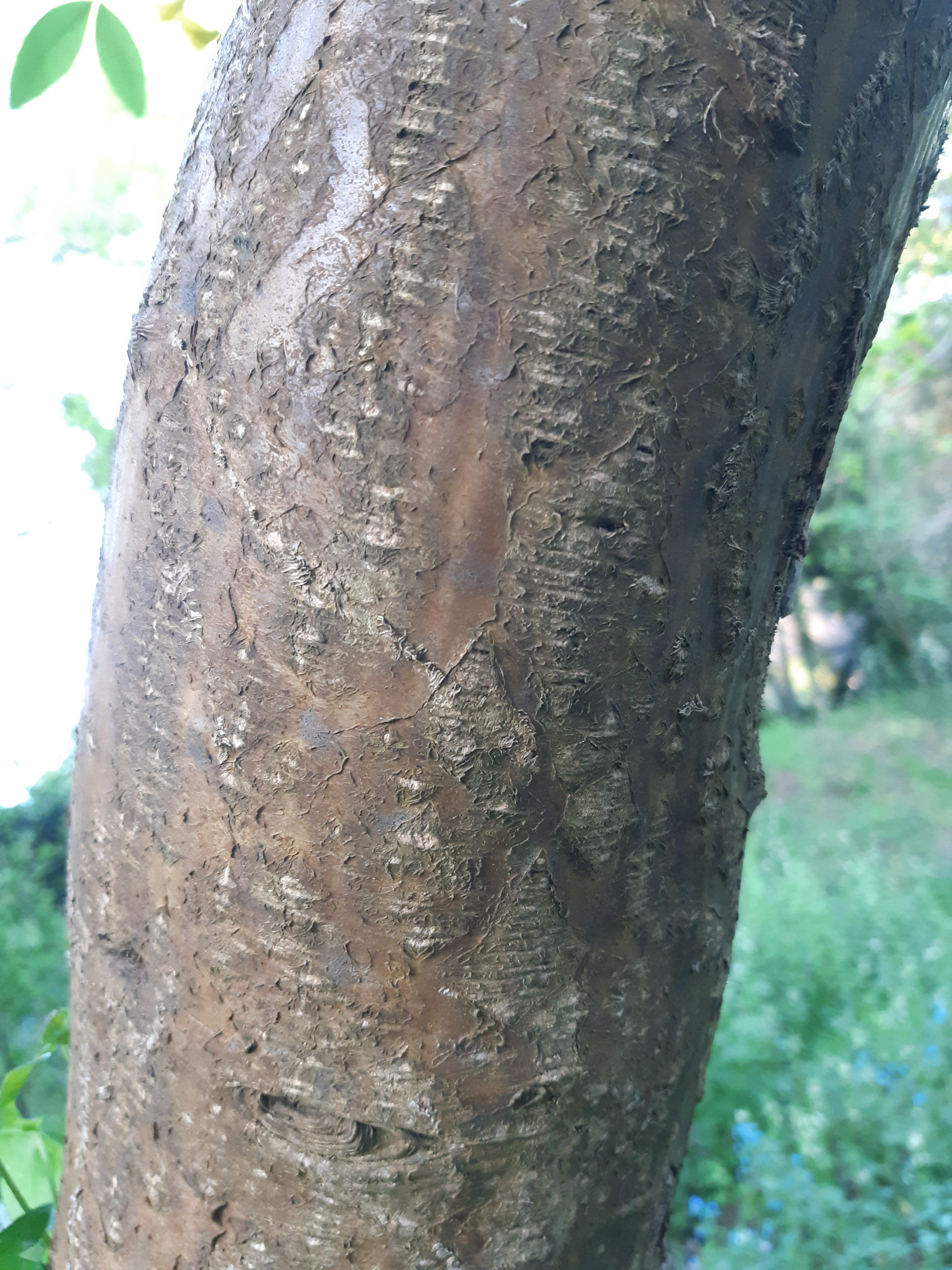
Laburnum

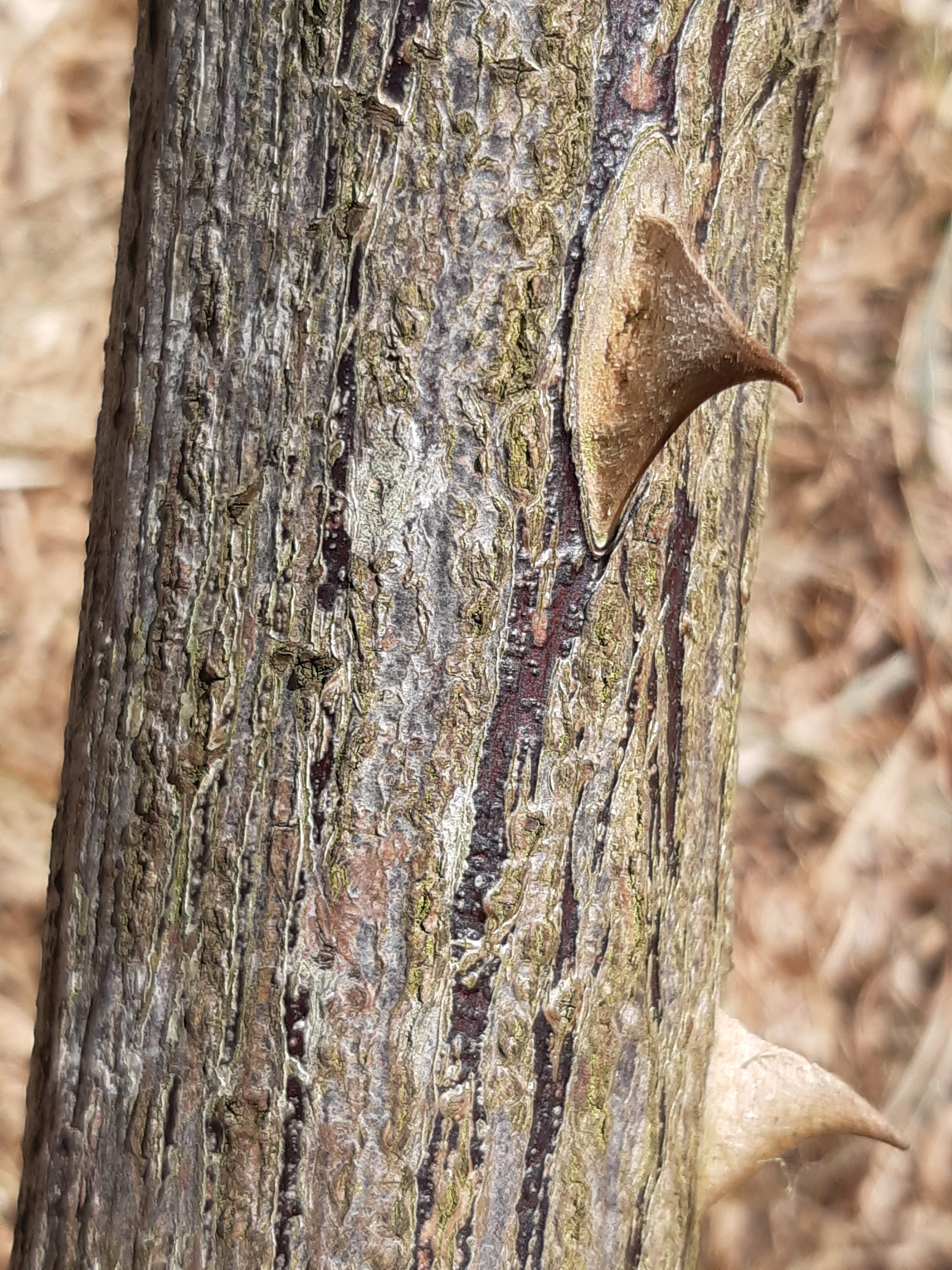
Dog rose

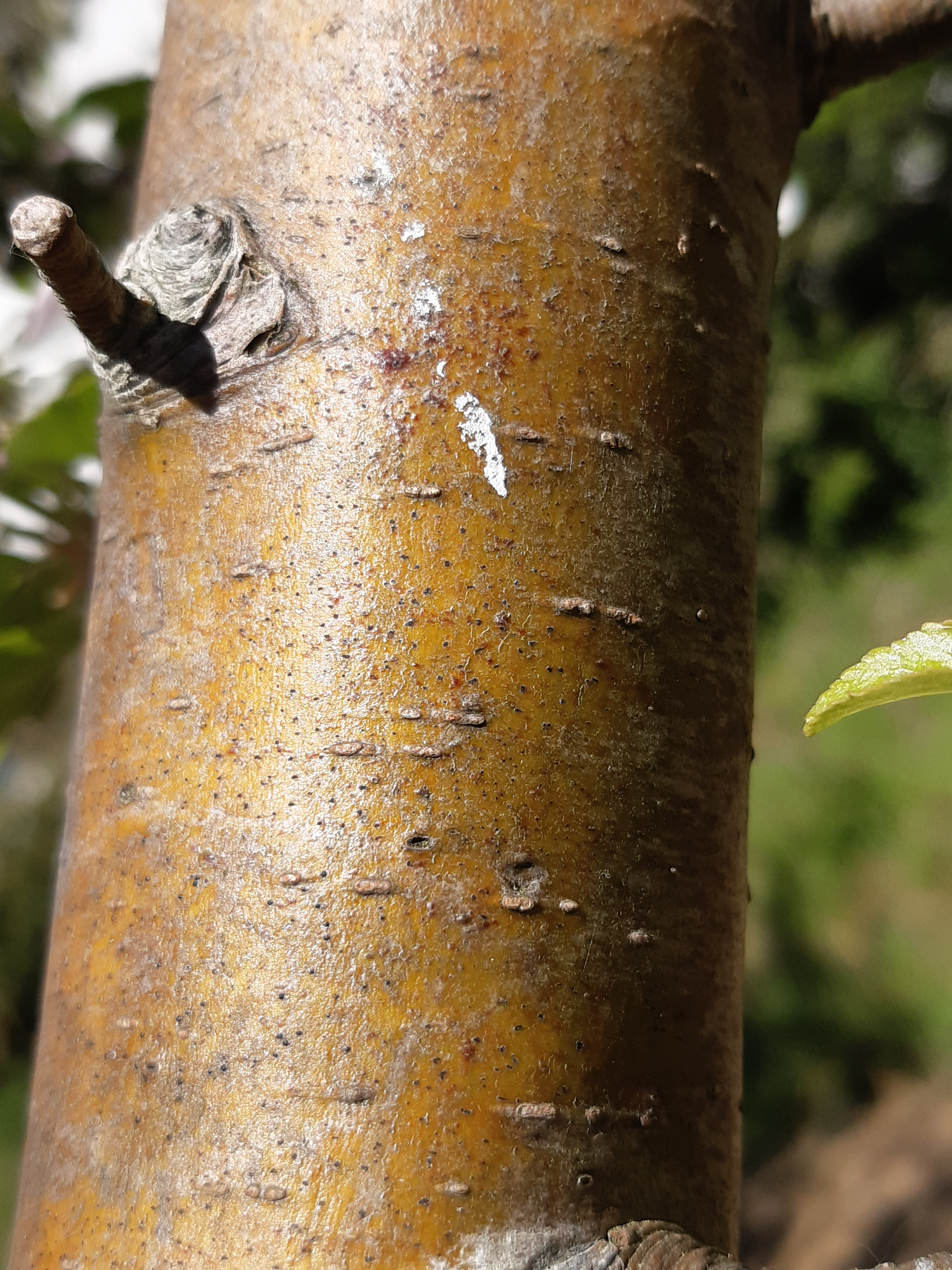
Crab apple

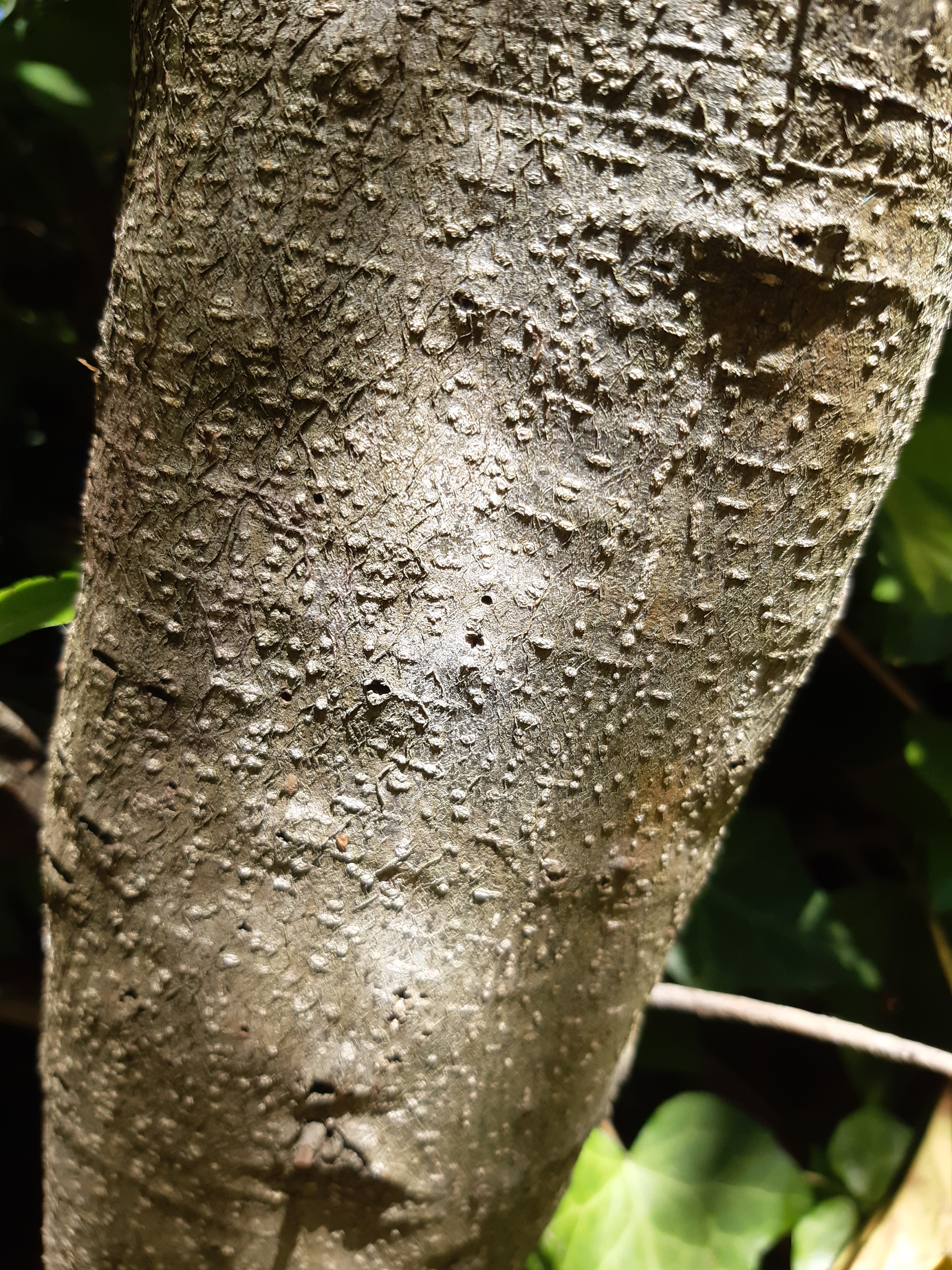
Narrowleaf firethorn

=== Activities ===
These photographs illustrate some of the educational and conservation activity on the reserve.

==== Conservation ====
Conservation activity photographs
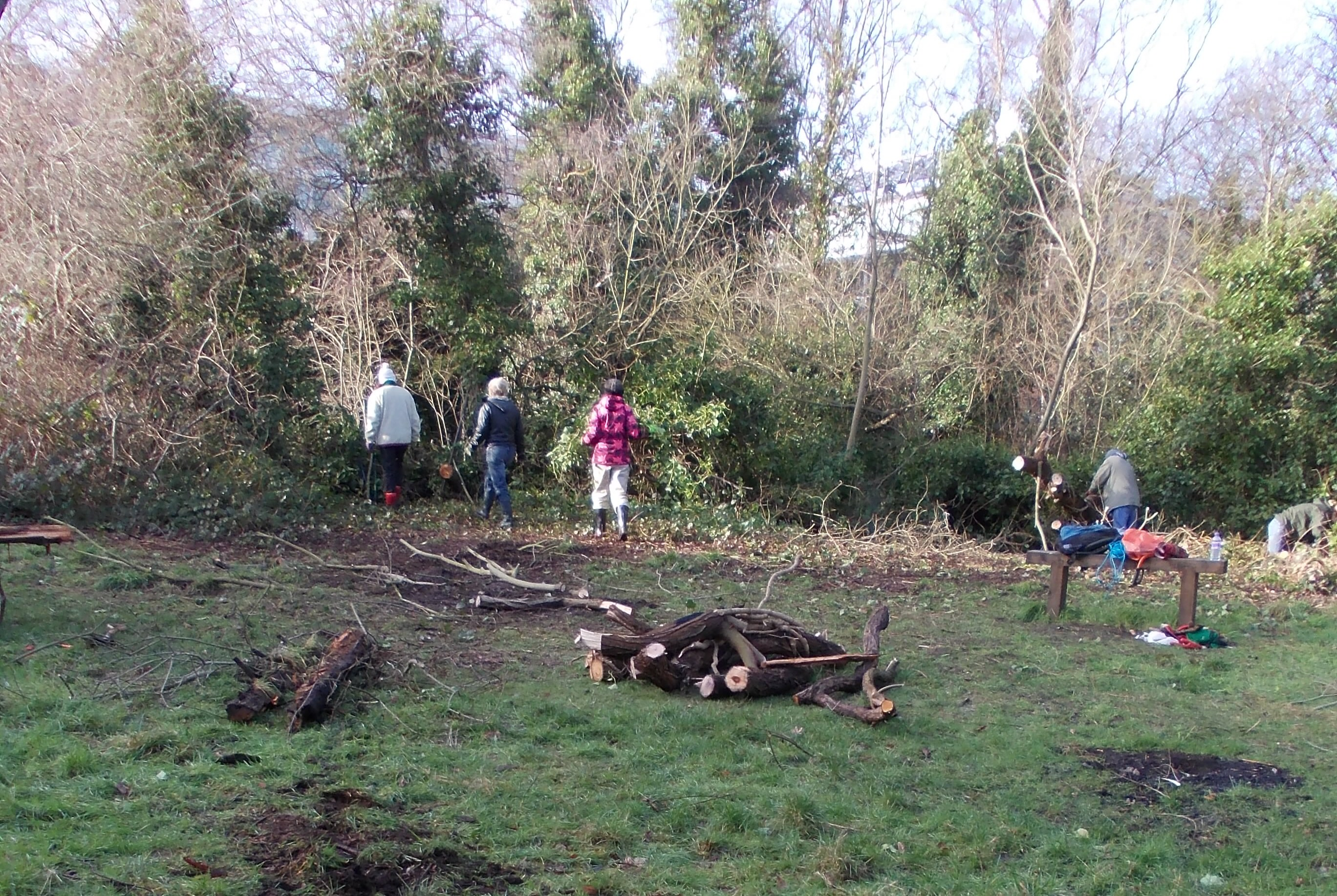
Volunteers clearing the picnic meadow

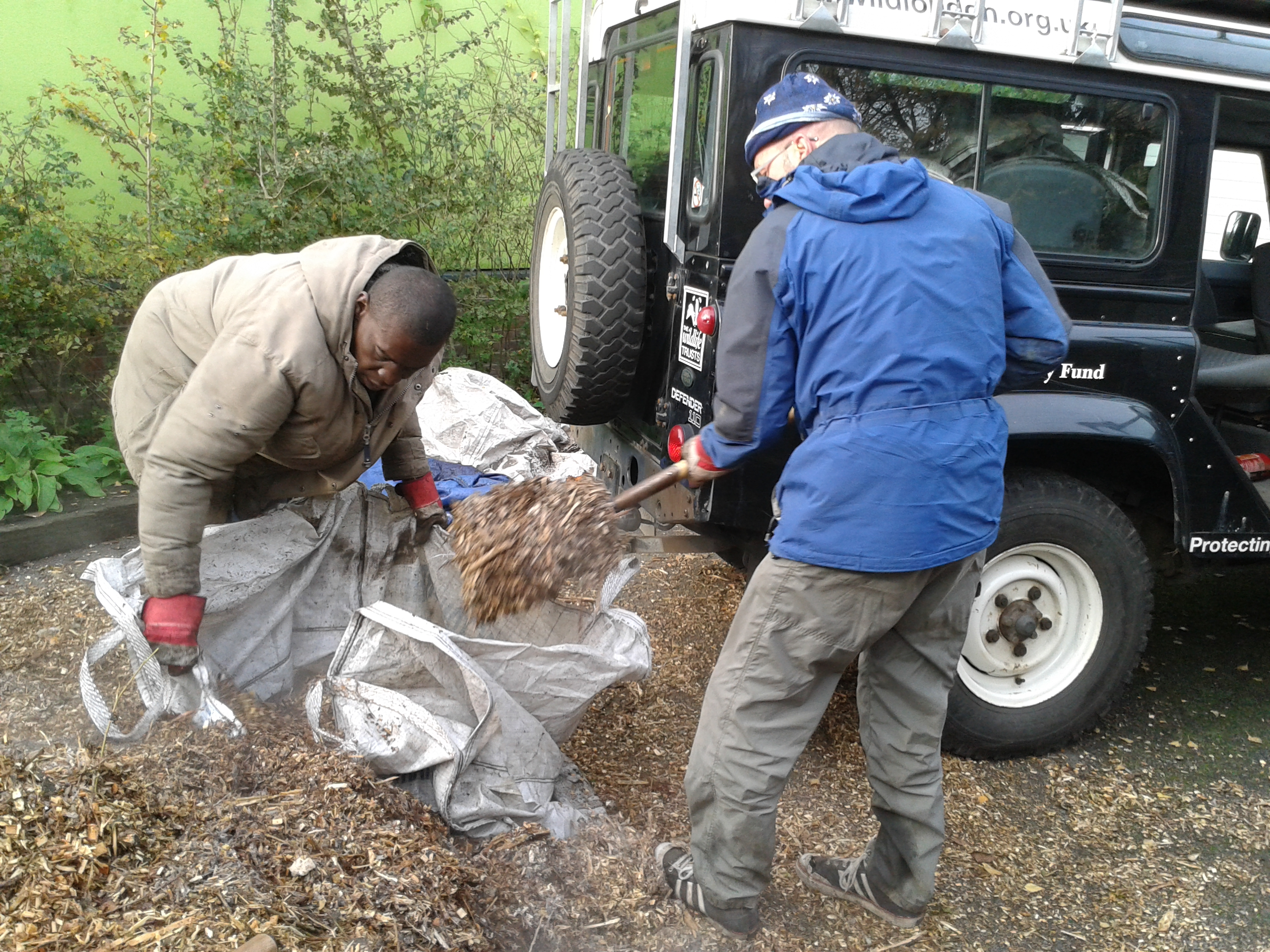
Shovelling woodchips into sacks

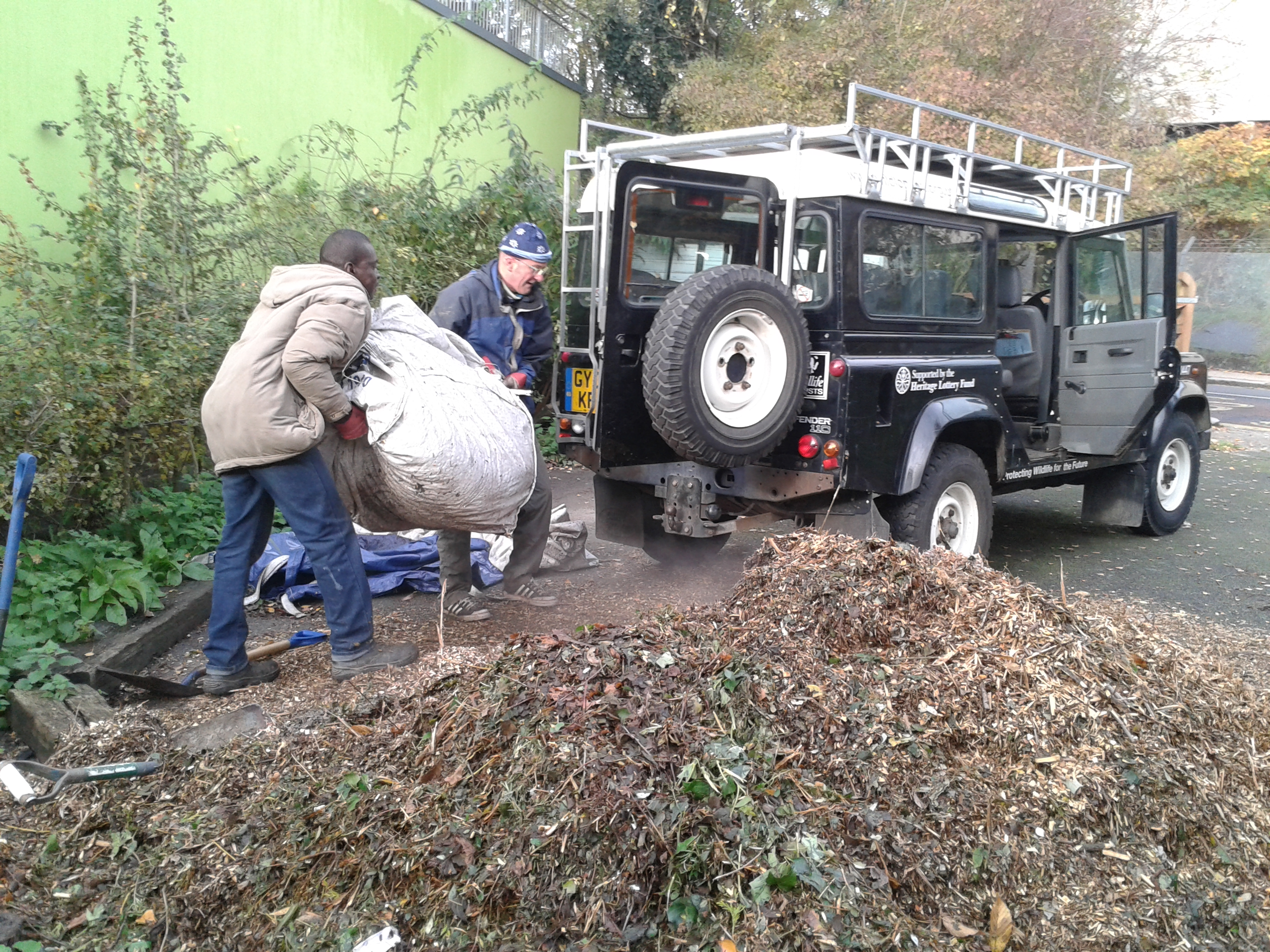
...and loading the sacks into the LWT Land-Rover

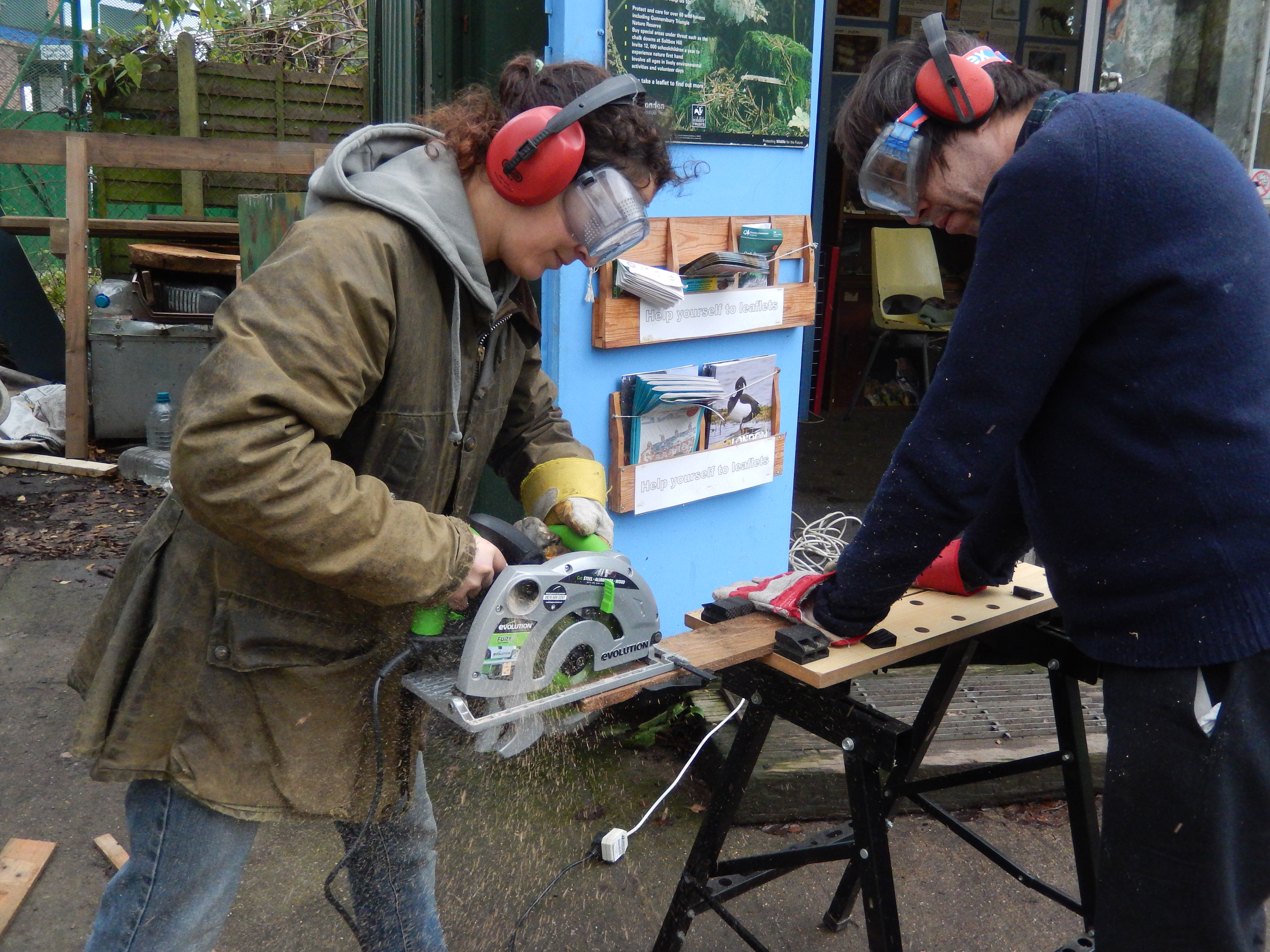
Using a circular saw to prepare an information panel

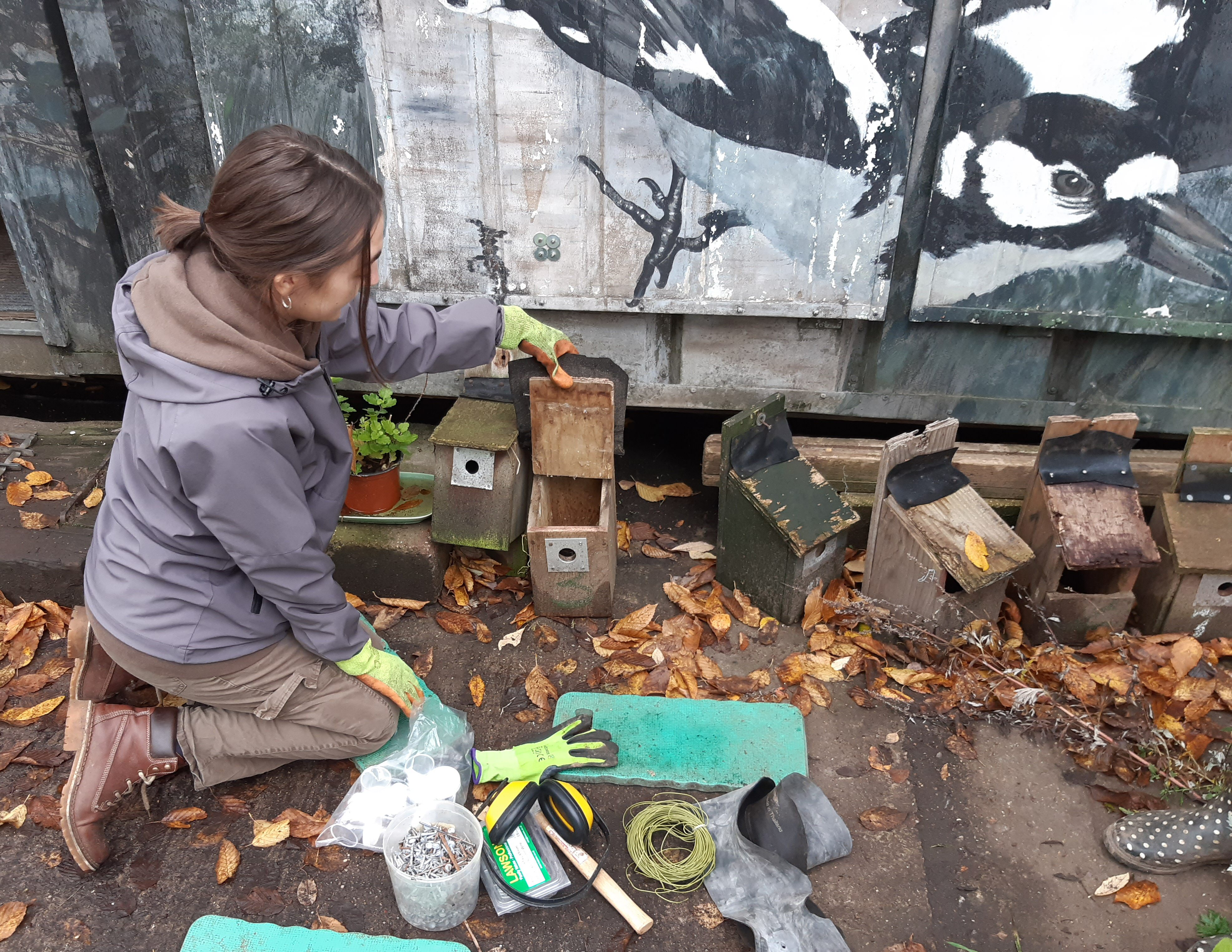
Checking nestboxes for spiders before cleaning and repairs

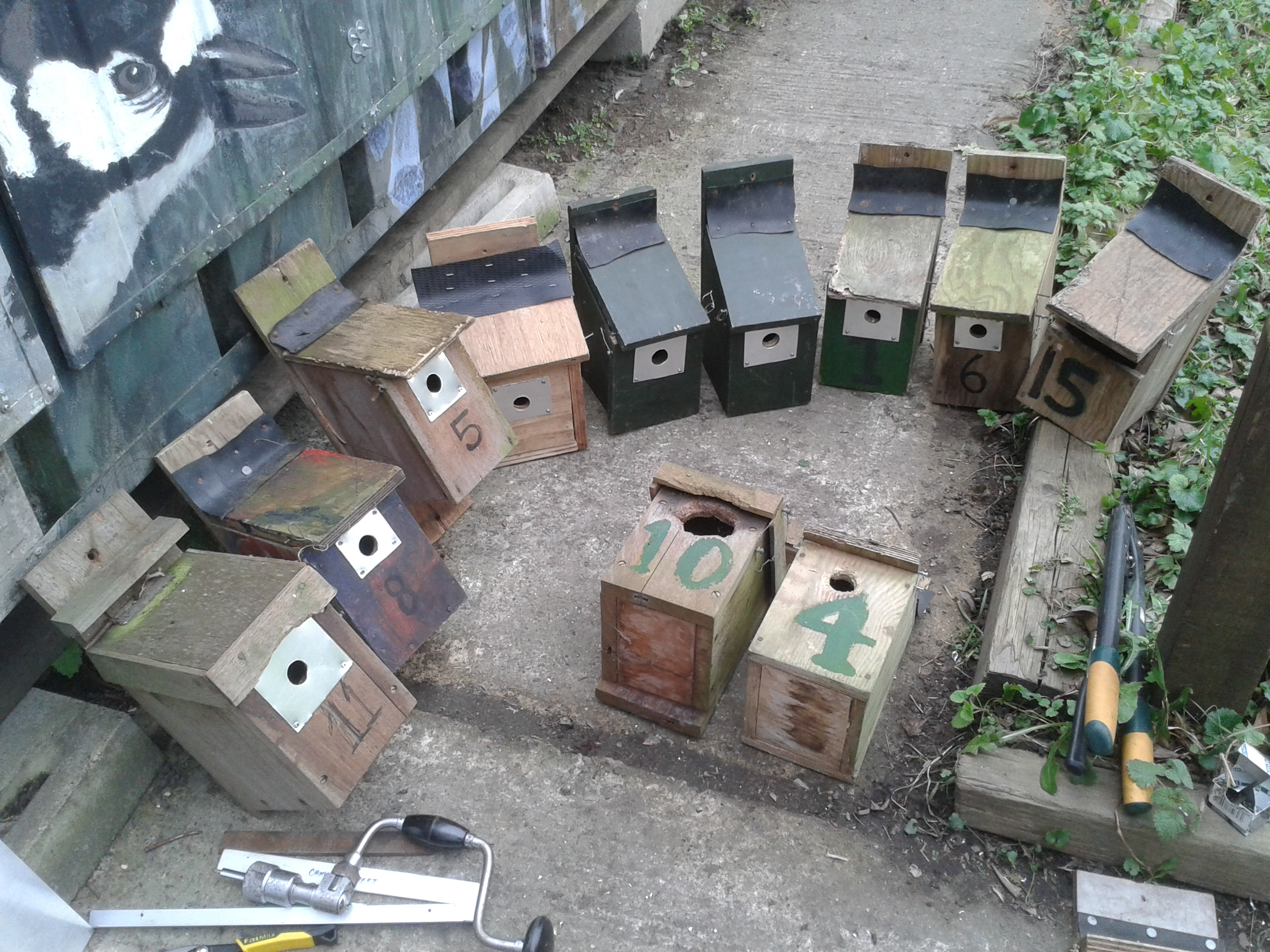
Repaired nestboxes for blue and great tits, unrepaired box at centre

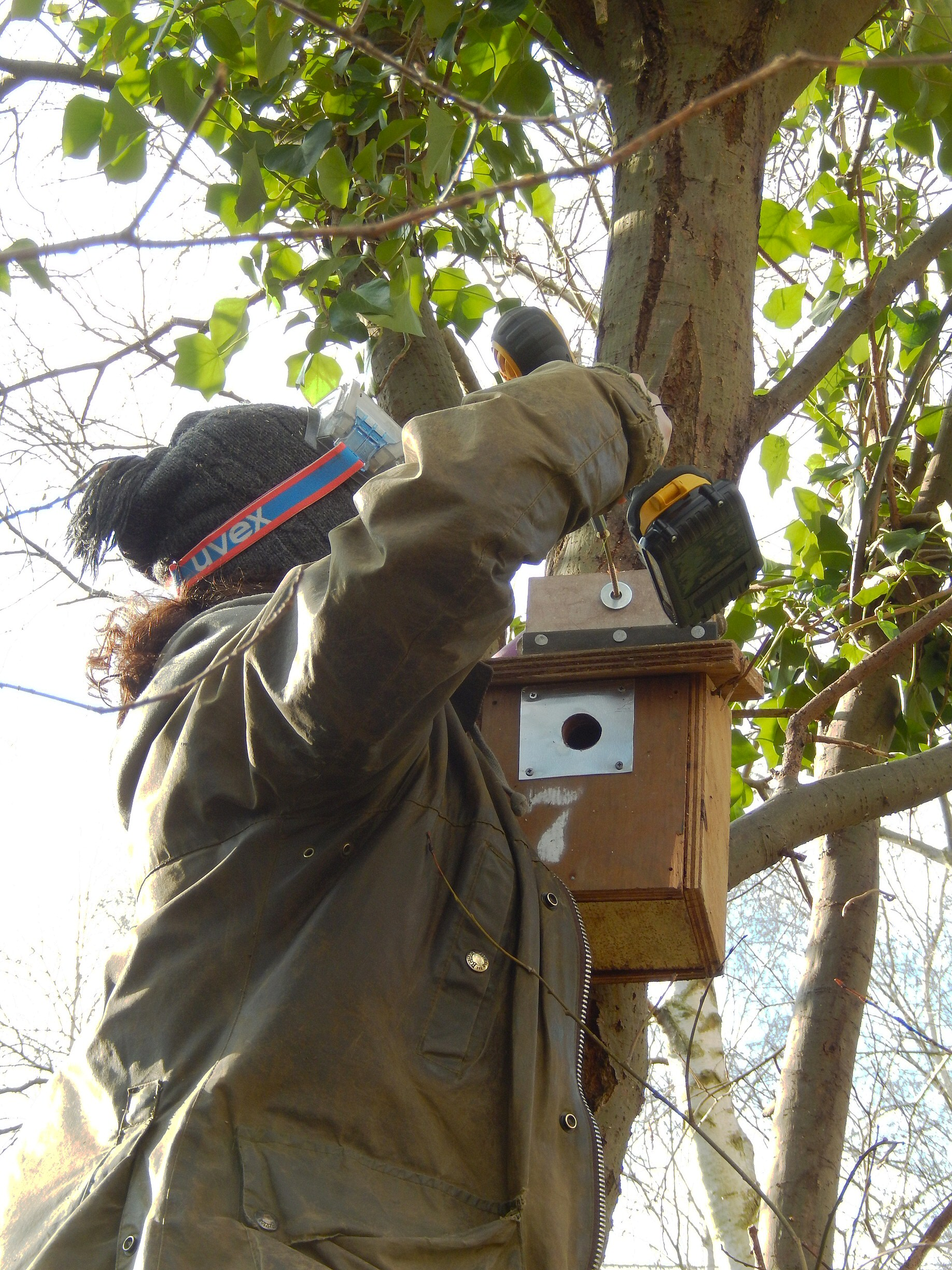
Putting up a nestbox

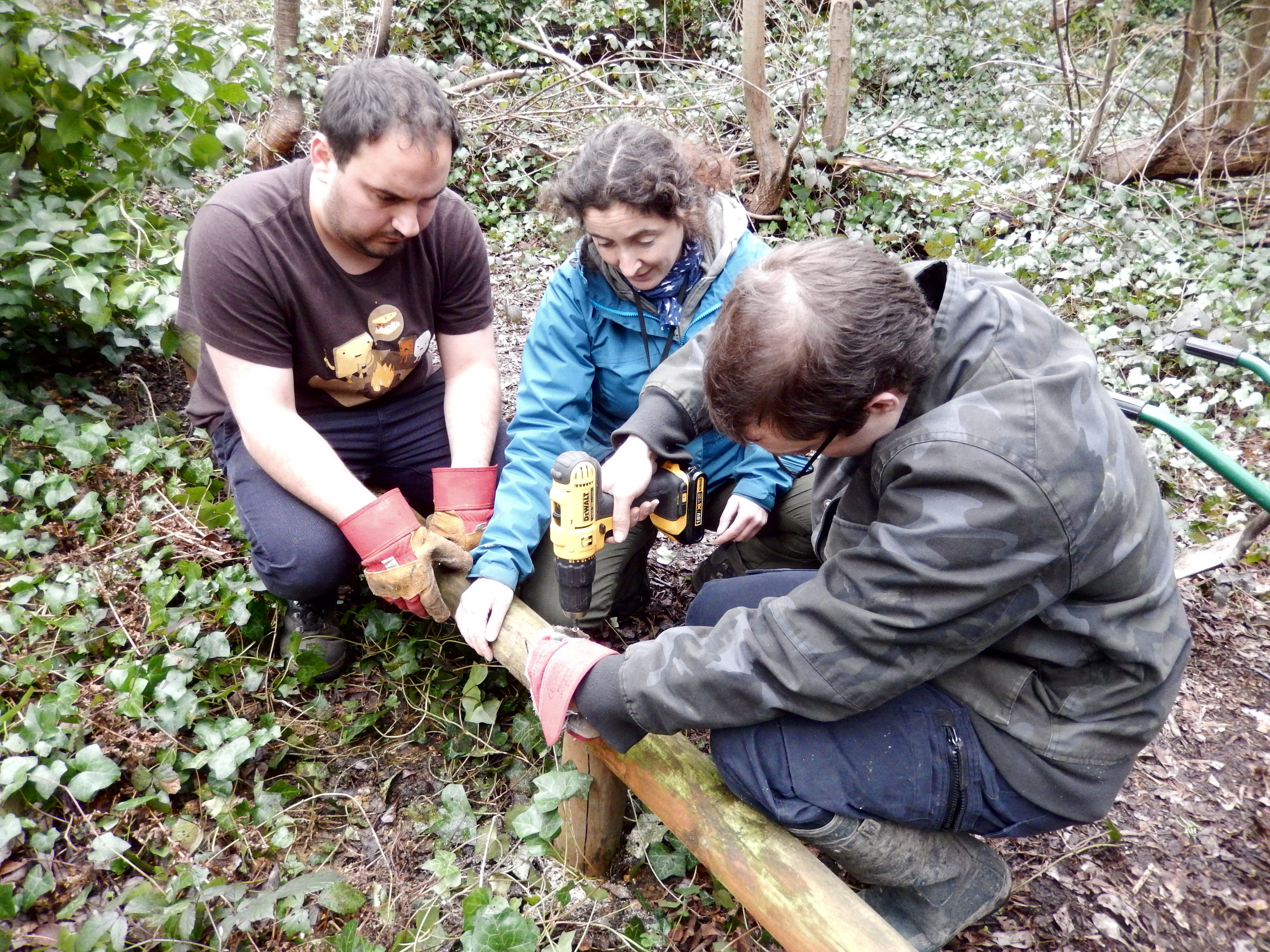
Fixing a wooden railing to protect native ferns

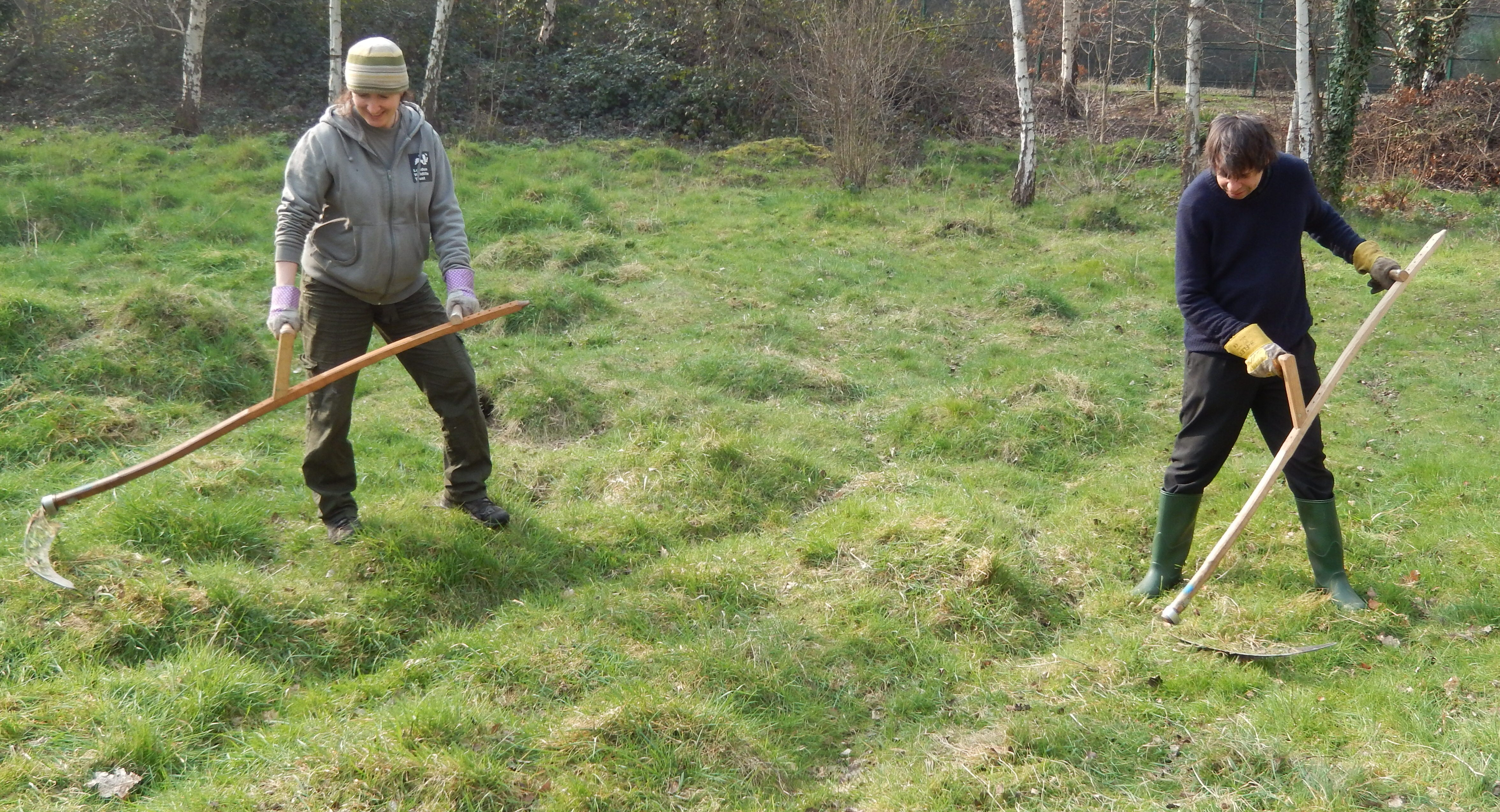
Scything the Anthill Meadow

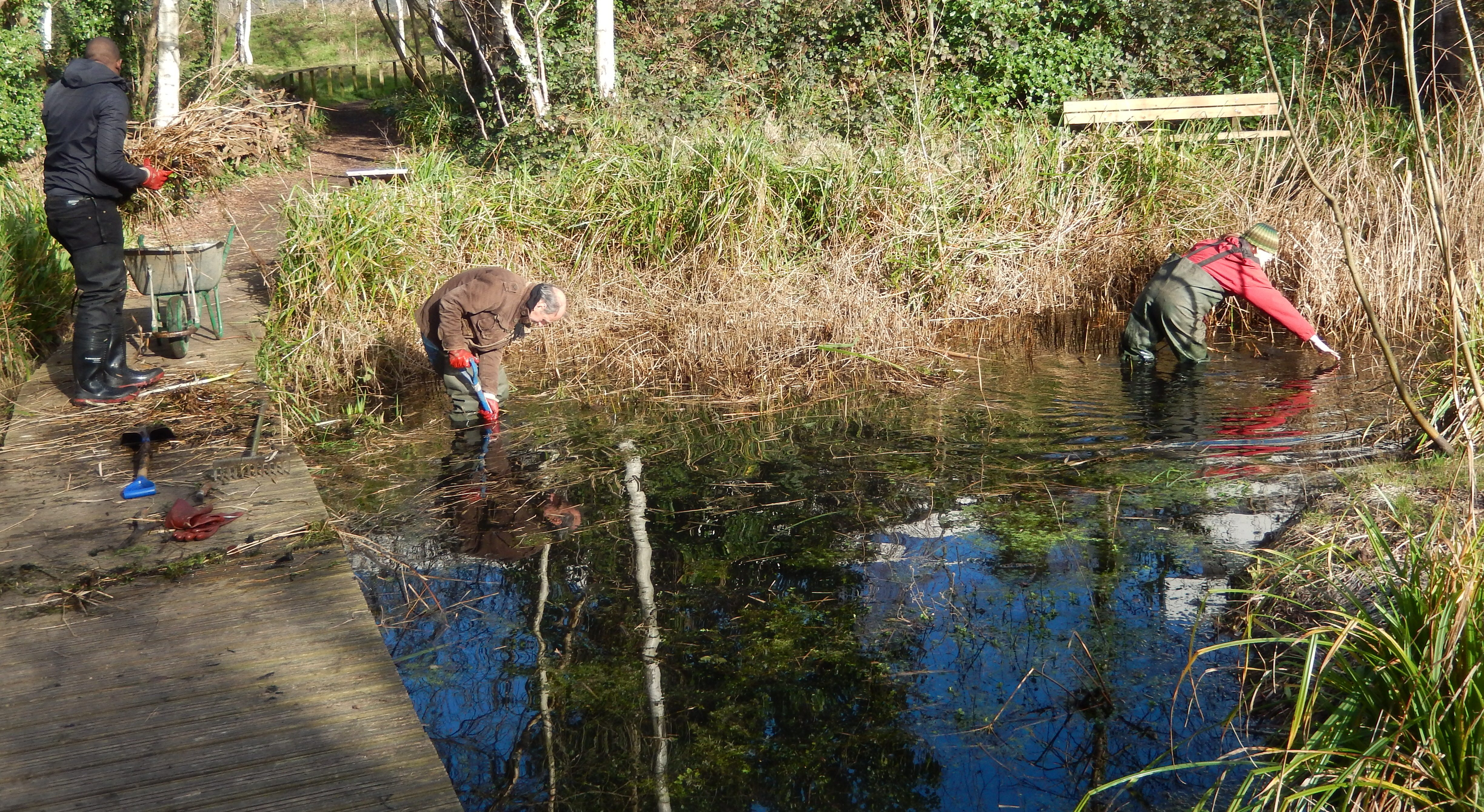
Volunteers cutting reeds and desilting the pond

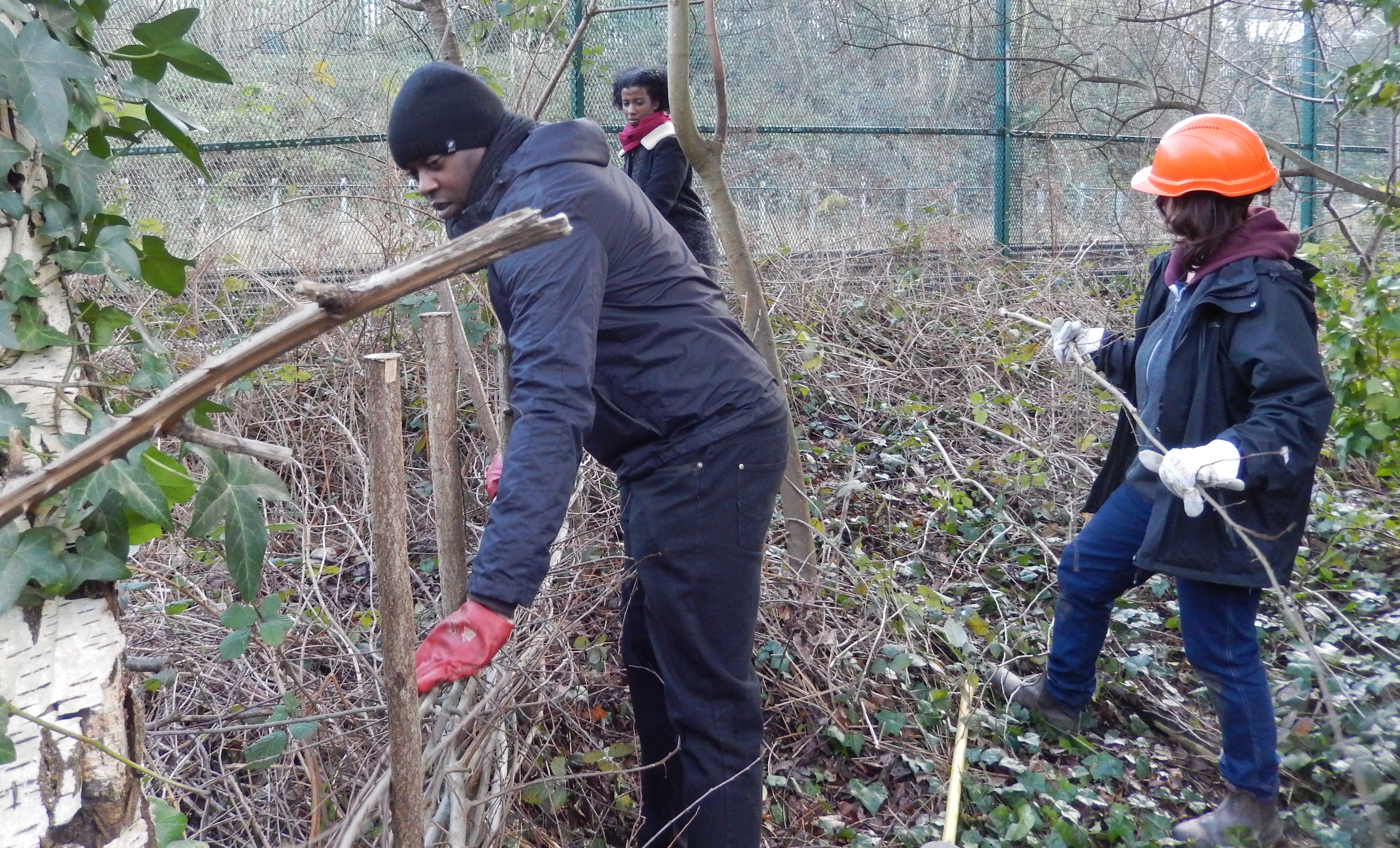
Weaving a hurdle deadhedge

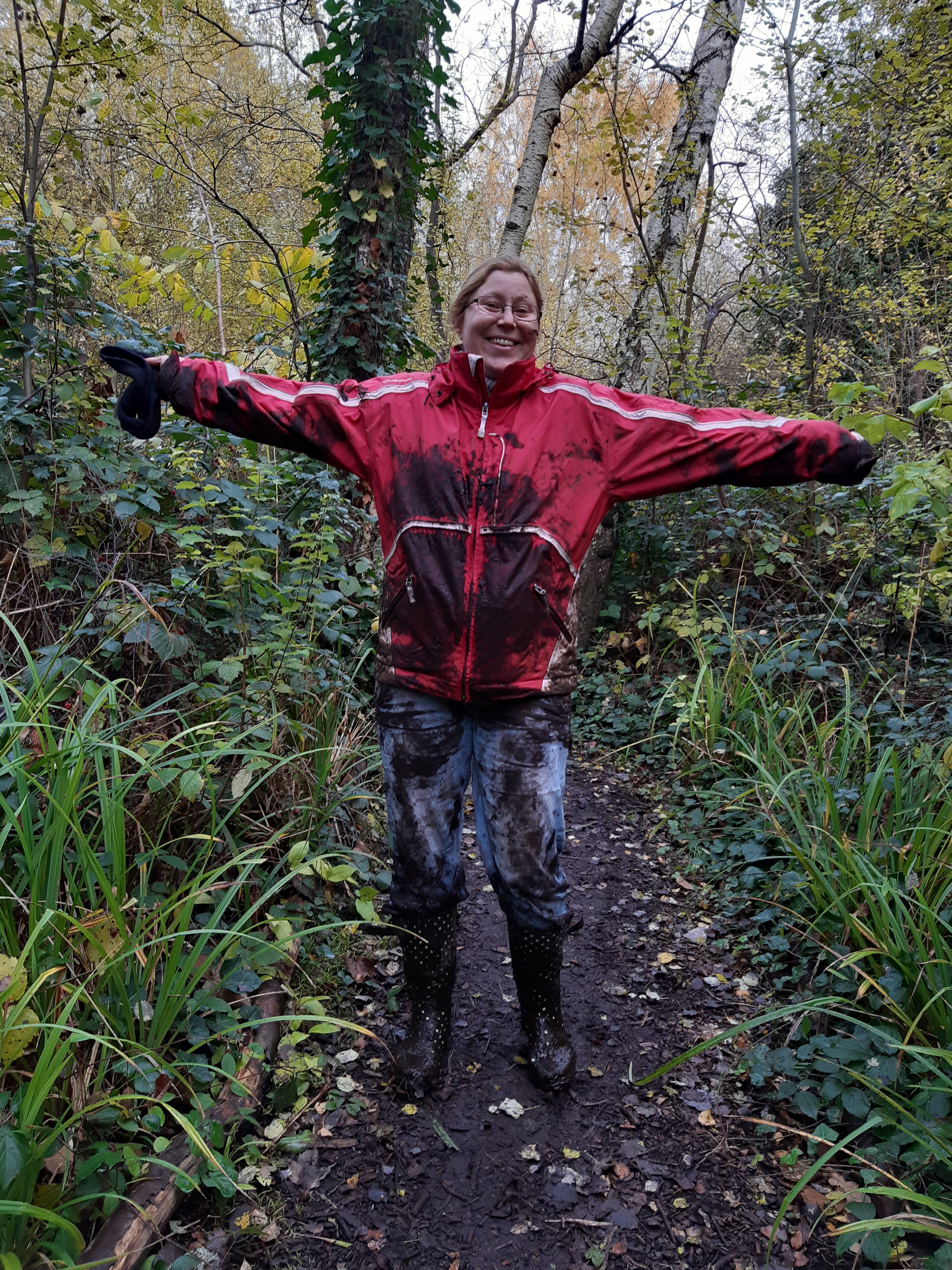
Muddy volunteer after a morning's work in wet woodland

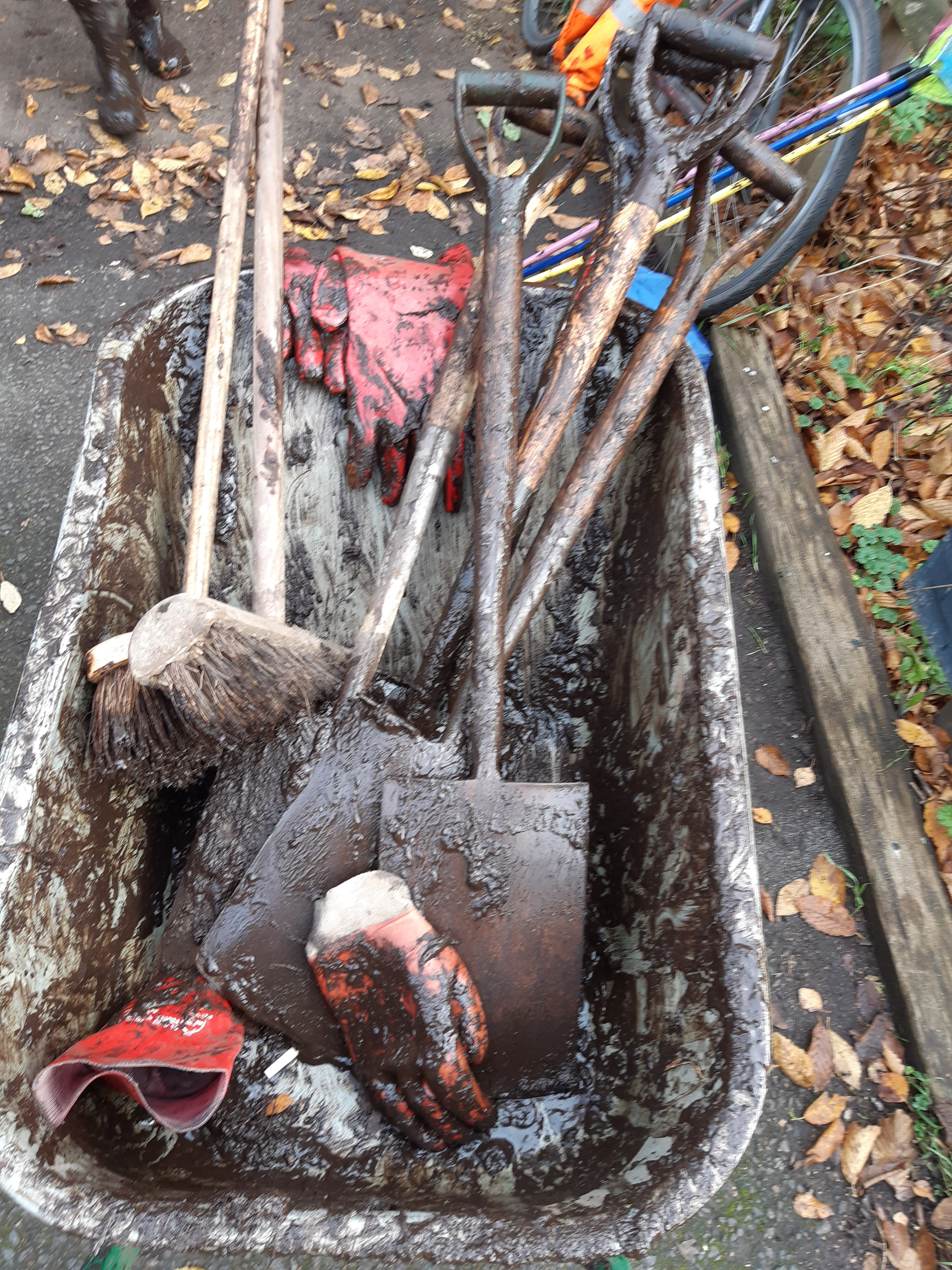
Wheelbarrow and tools after a morning's work in wet woodland

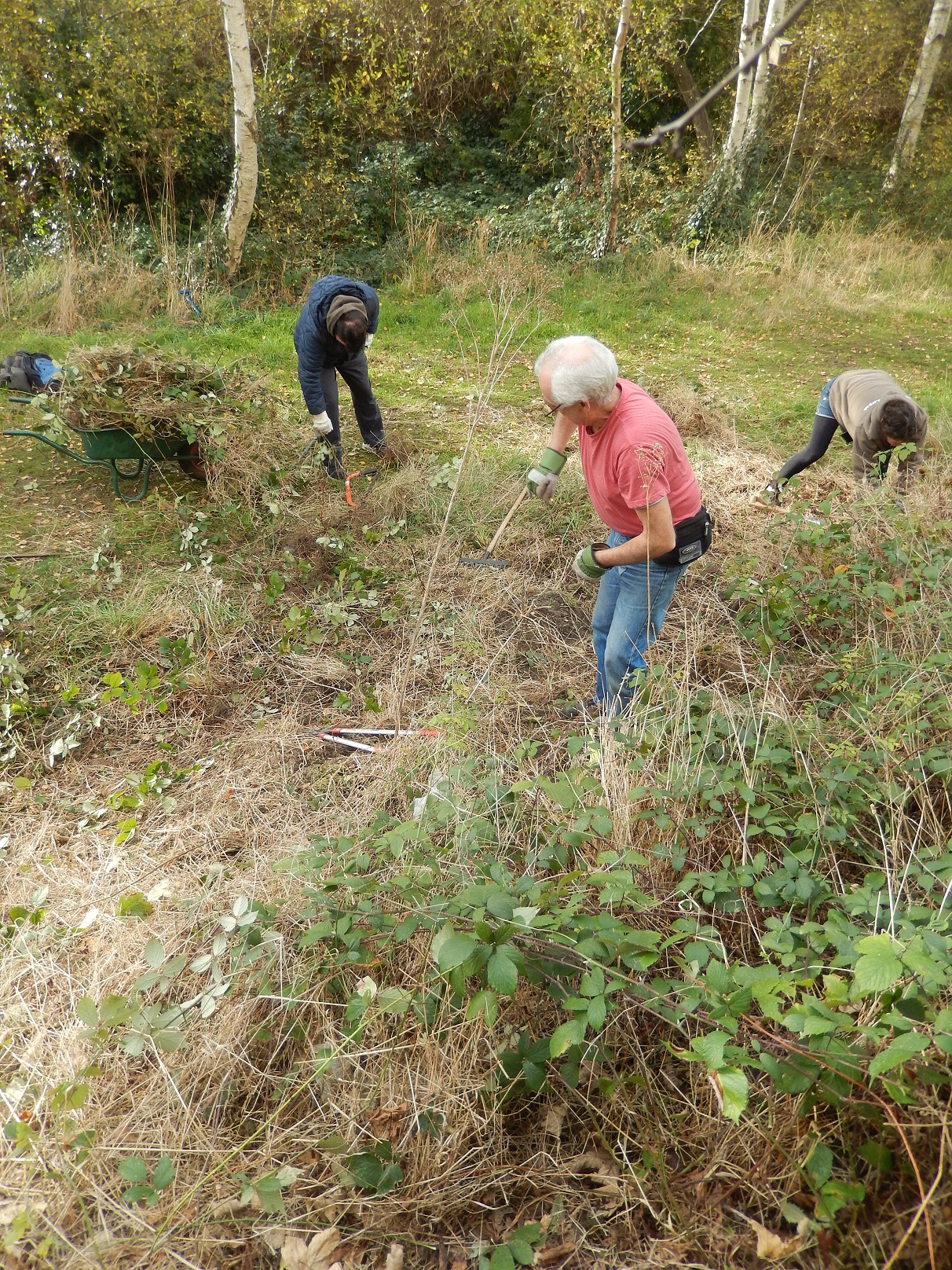
De-brambling the butterfly bank

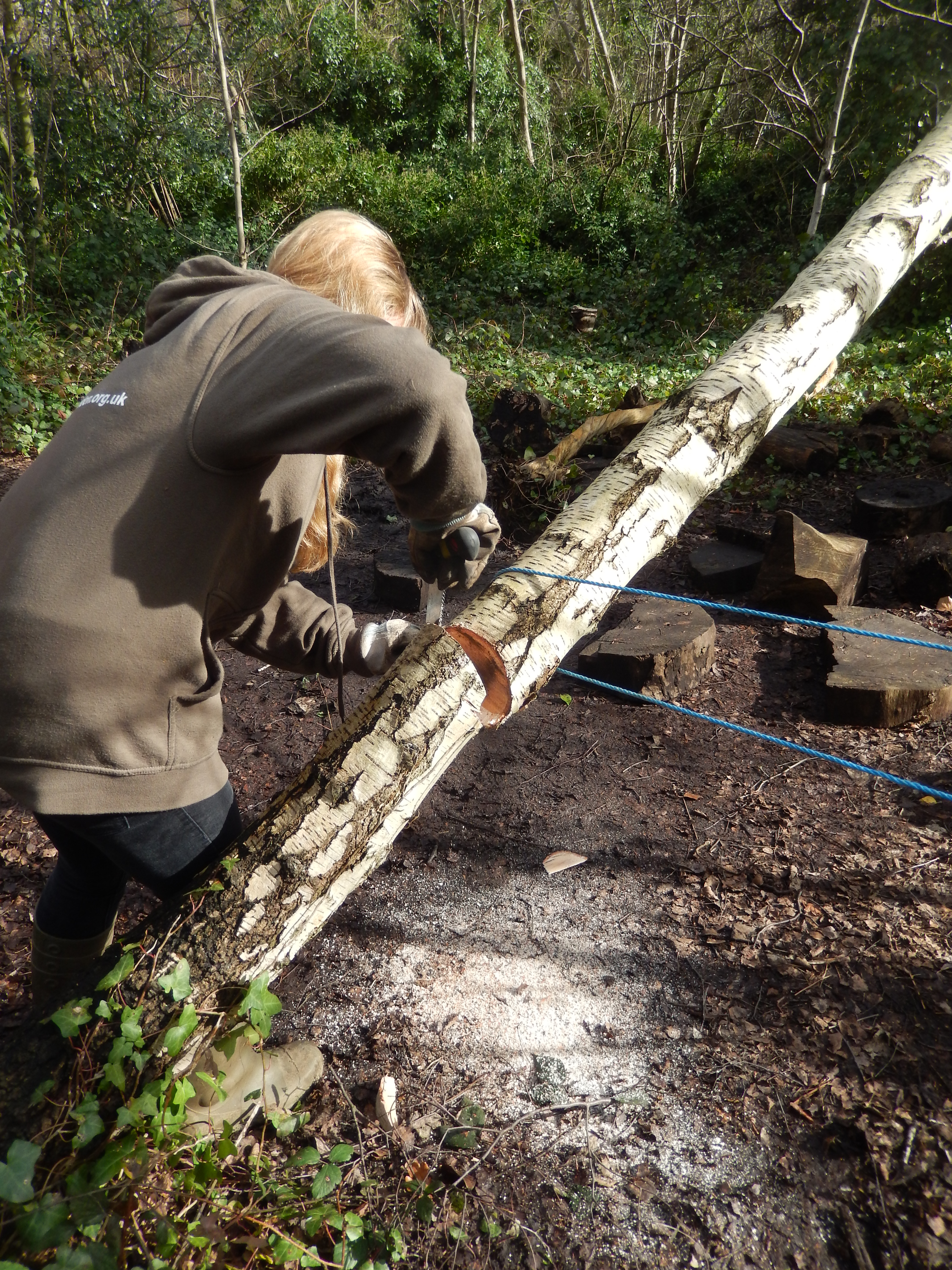
Cutting a fallen birch after heavy rain

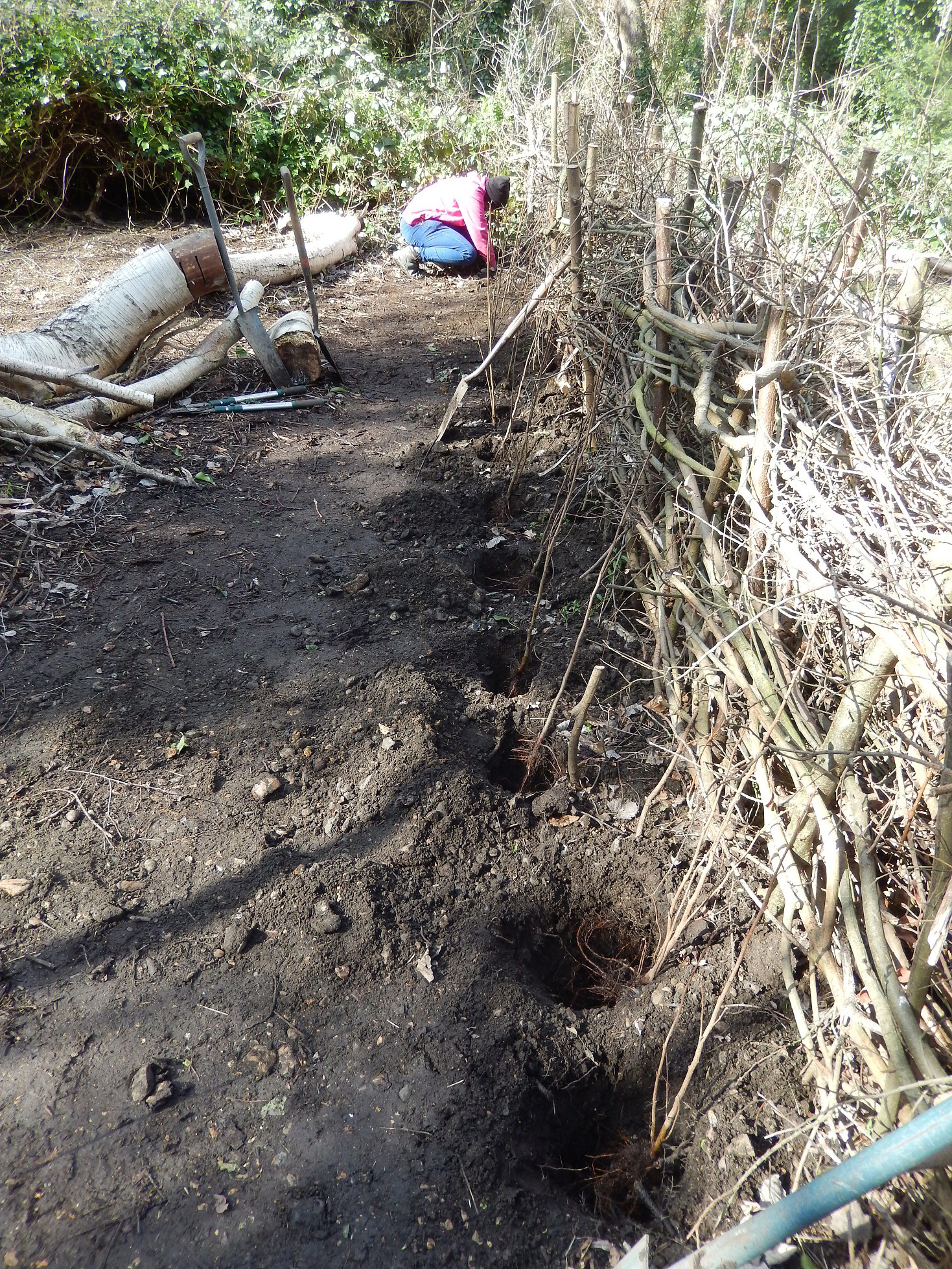
Planting a hazel hedge

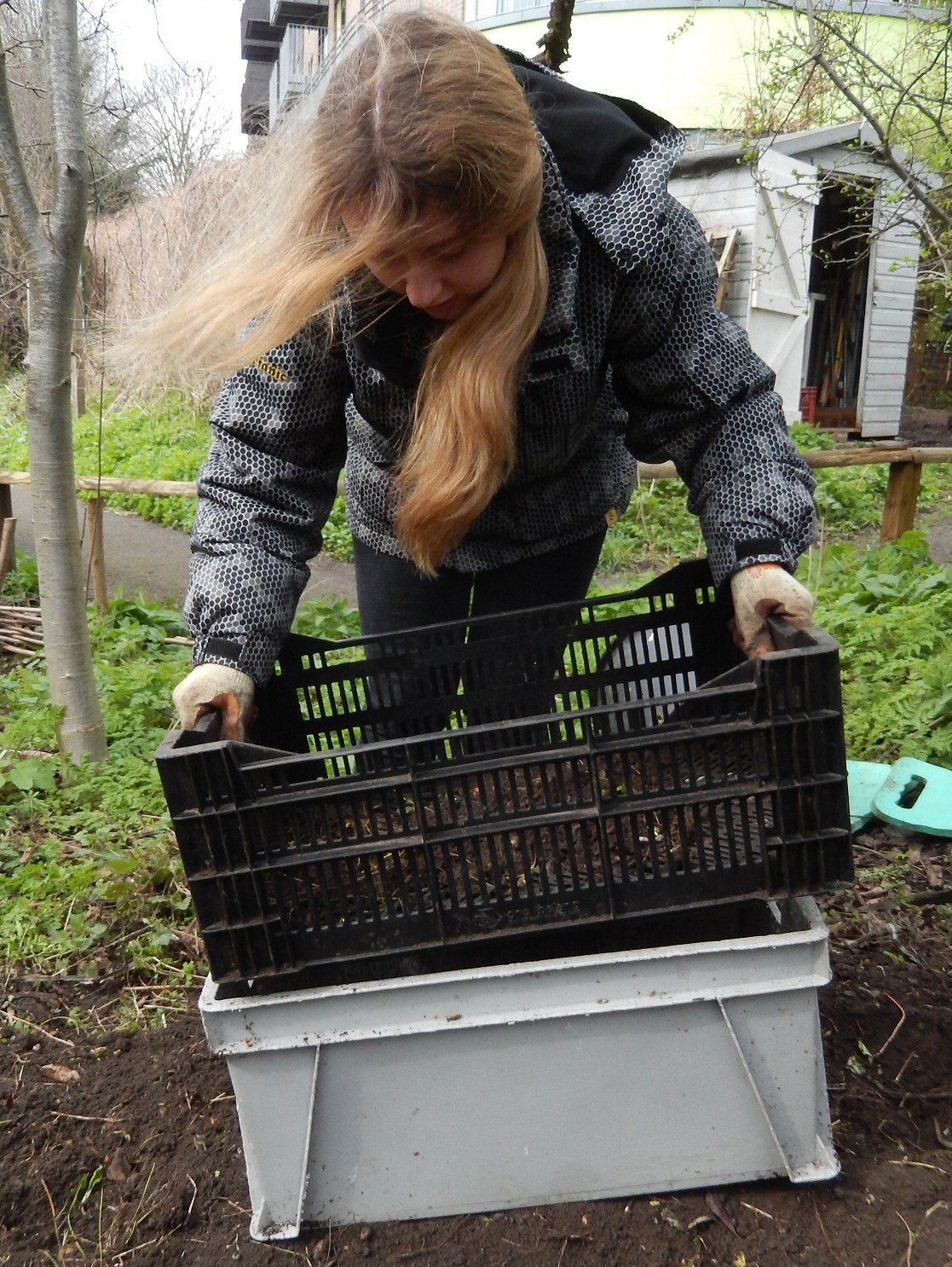
Sieving earth for demonstration meadow

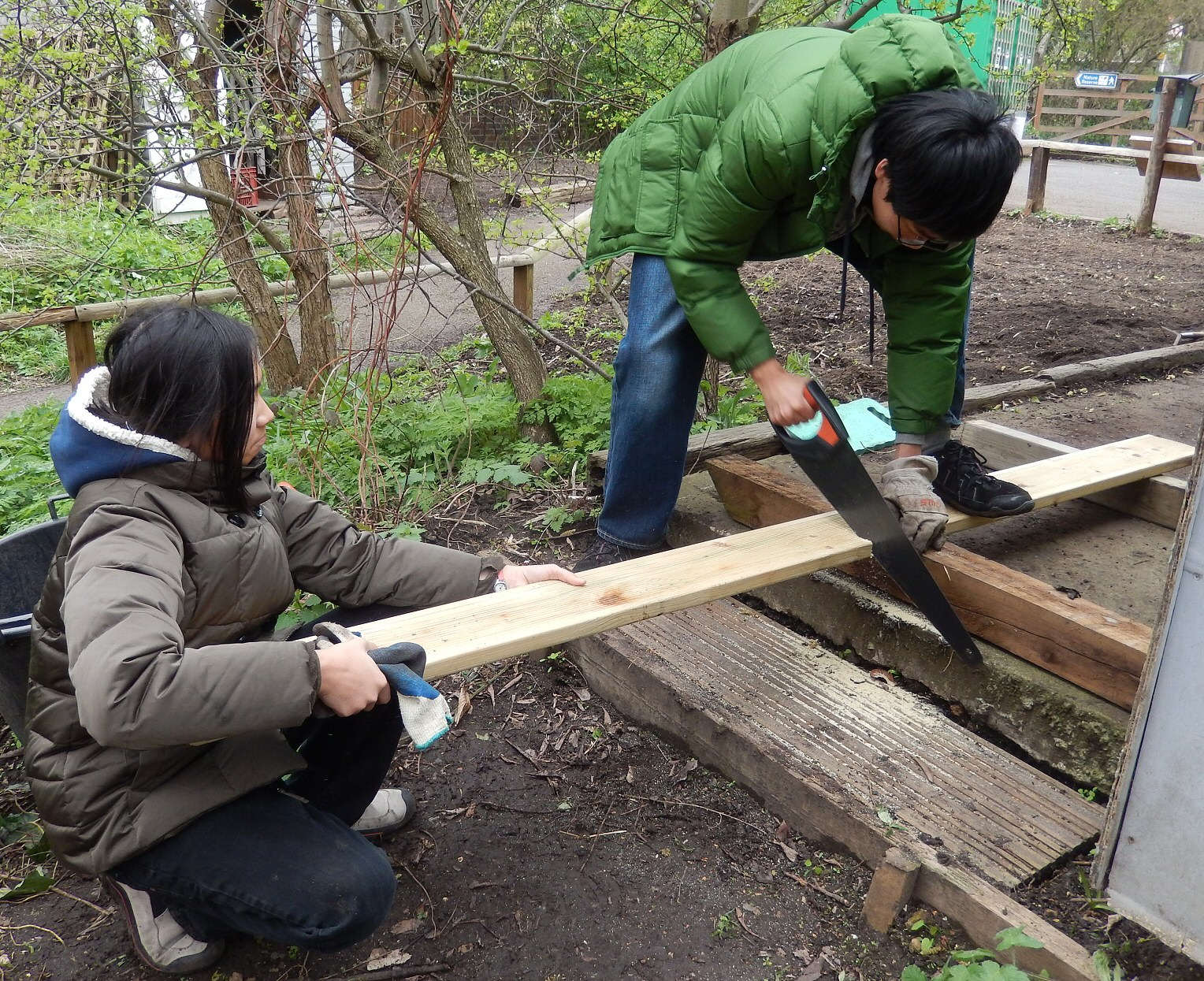
Sawing a board to length for a boardwalk

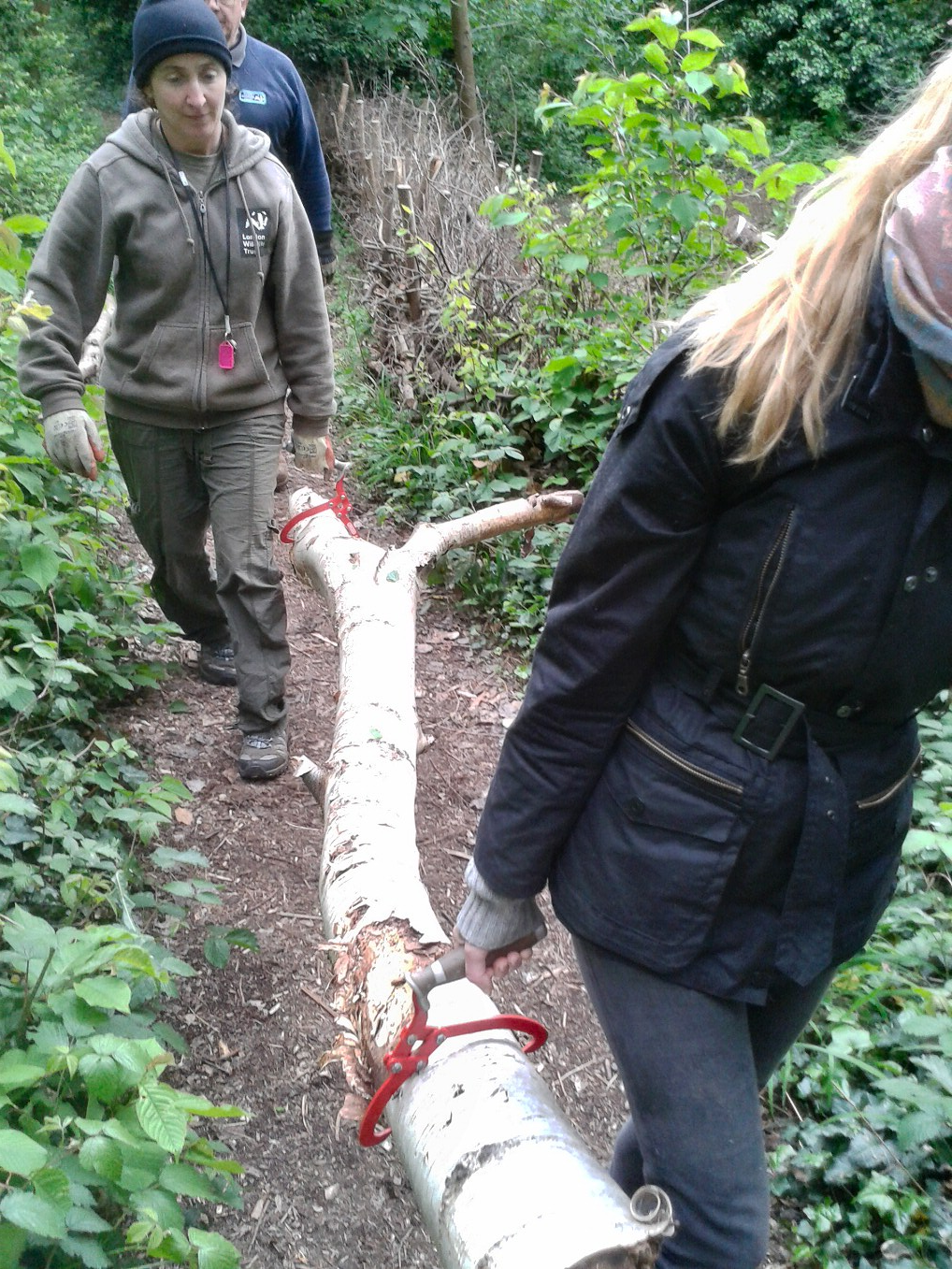
Carrying a birch log for path edging

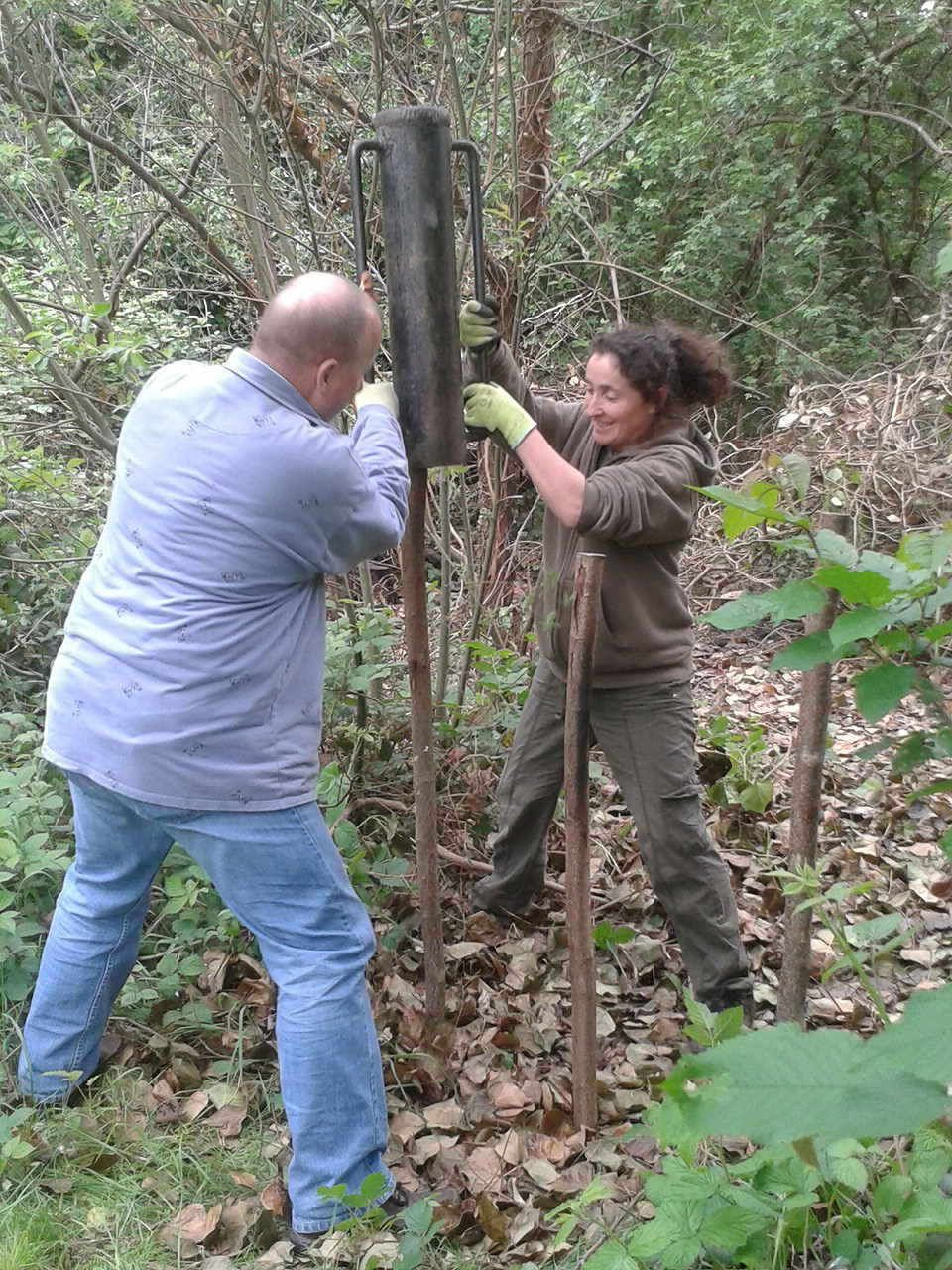
Hammering in a post ... up

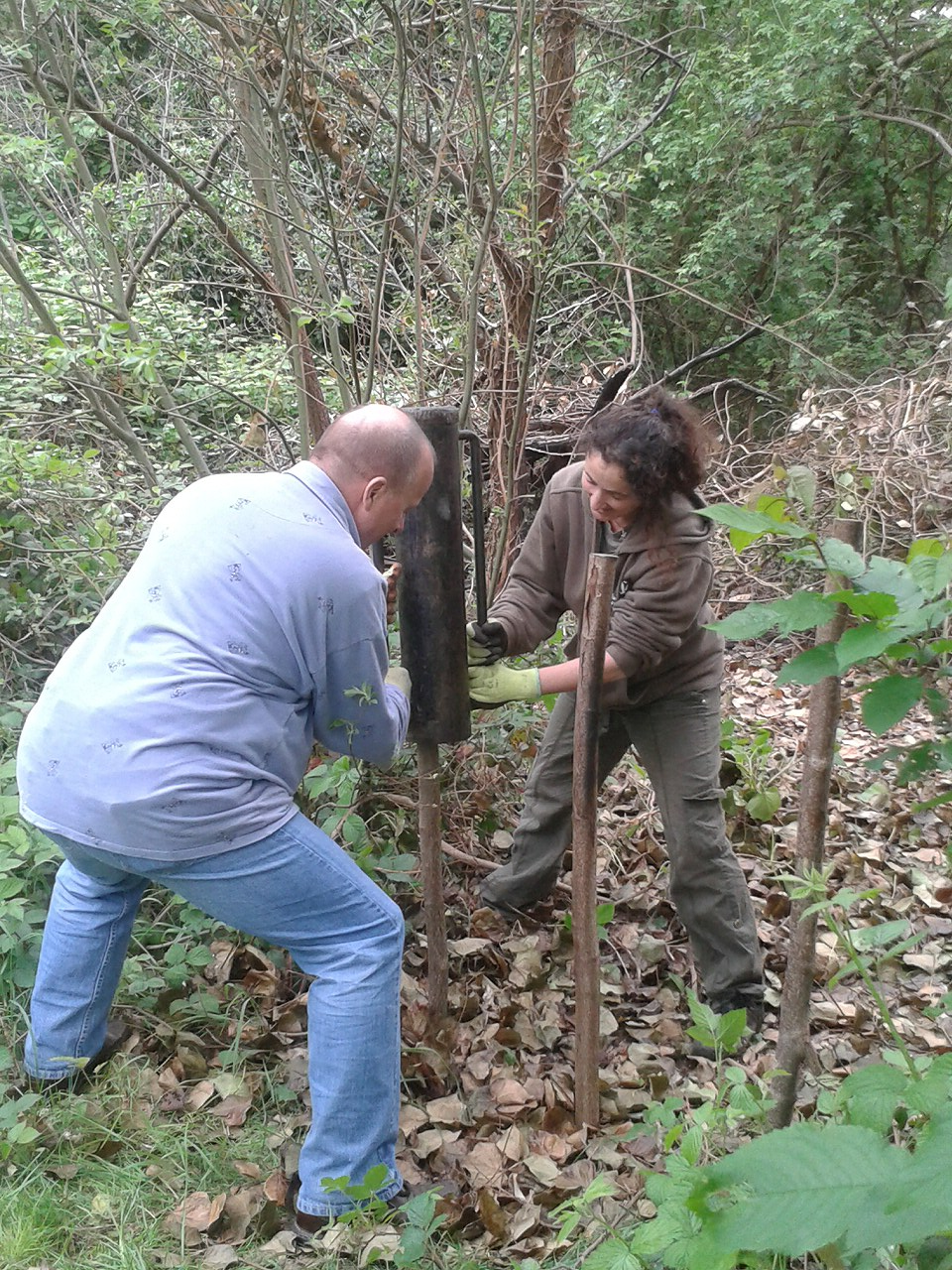
Hammering in a post ... down

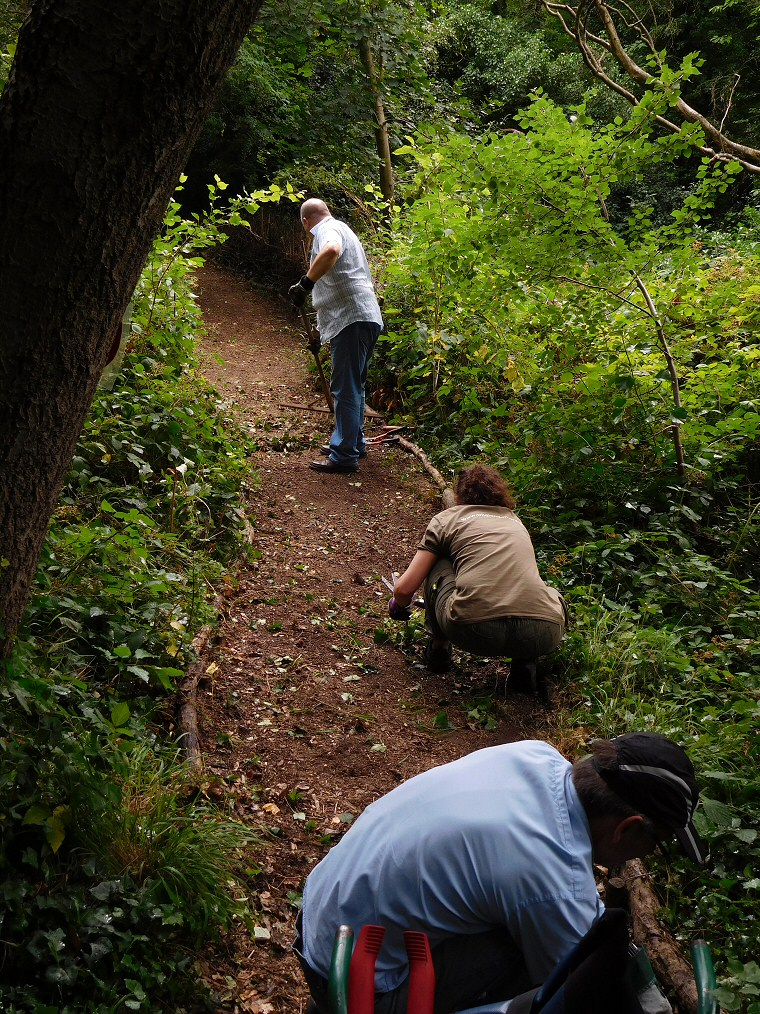
Keeping path edges clear of ivy

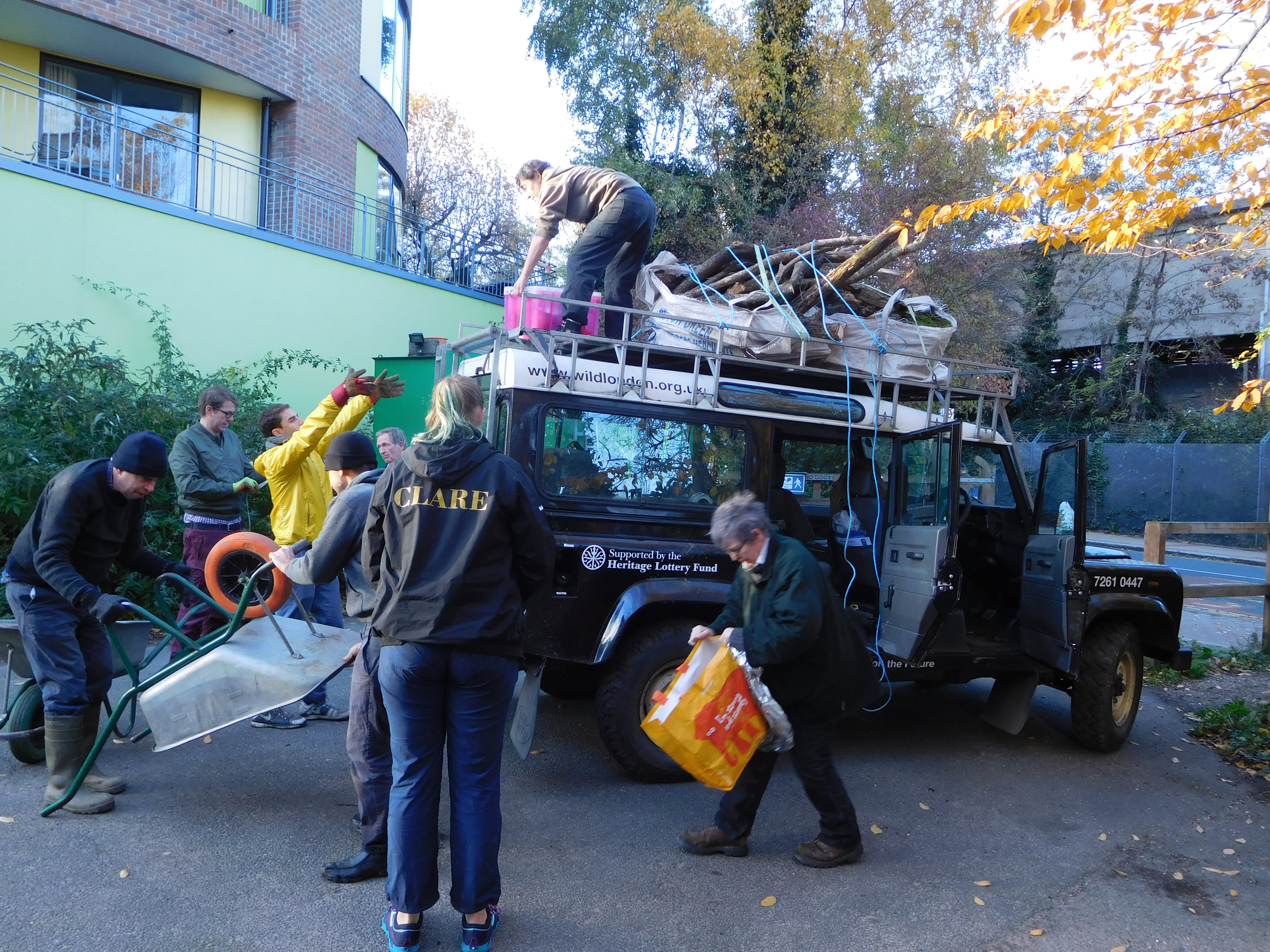
Unloading logs from the London Wildlife Trust Land-Rover for minibeast logpile

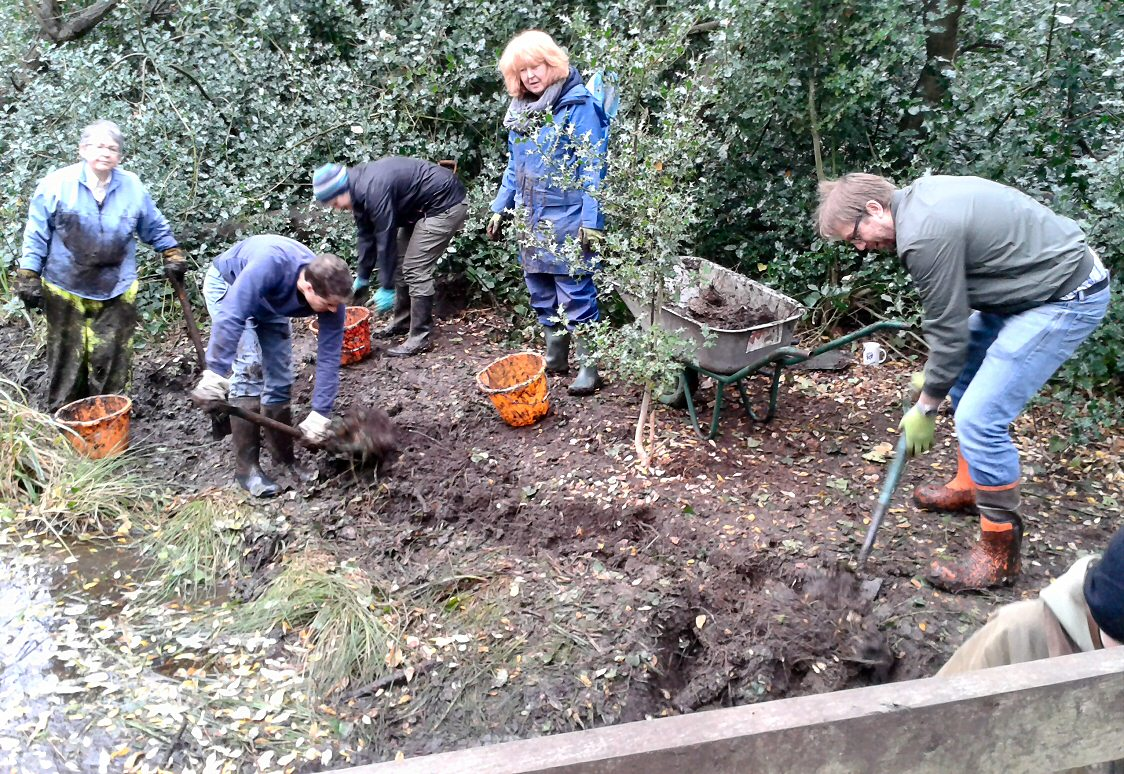
Digging out wet woodland

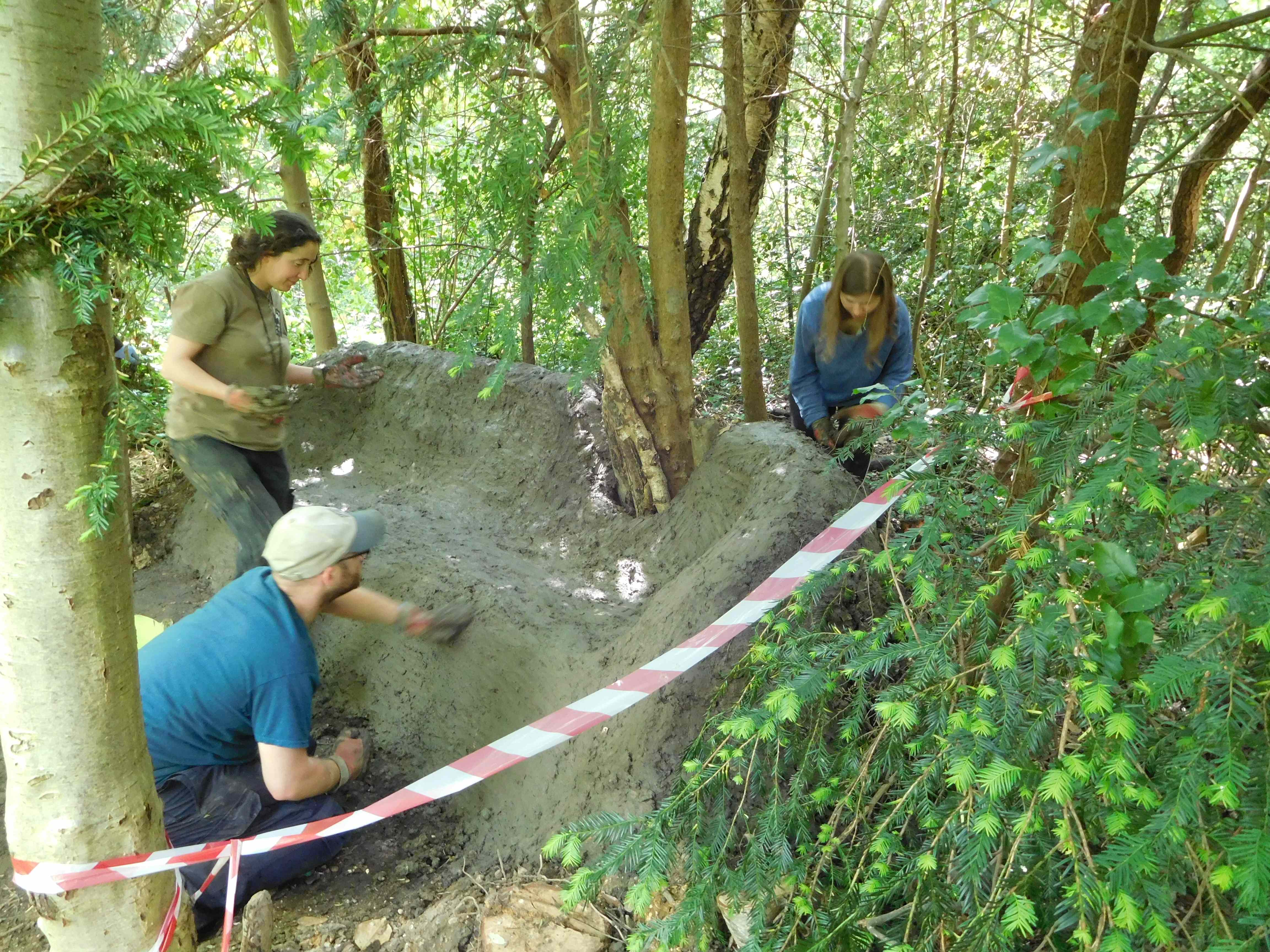
Staff and volunteers smoothing surface of mud sofa, a temporary barrier of local material

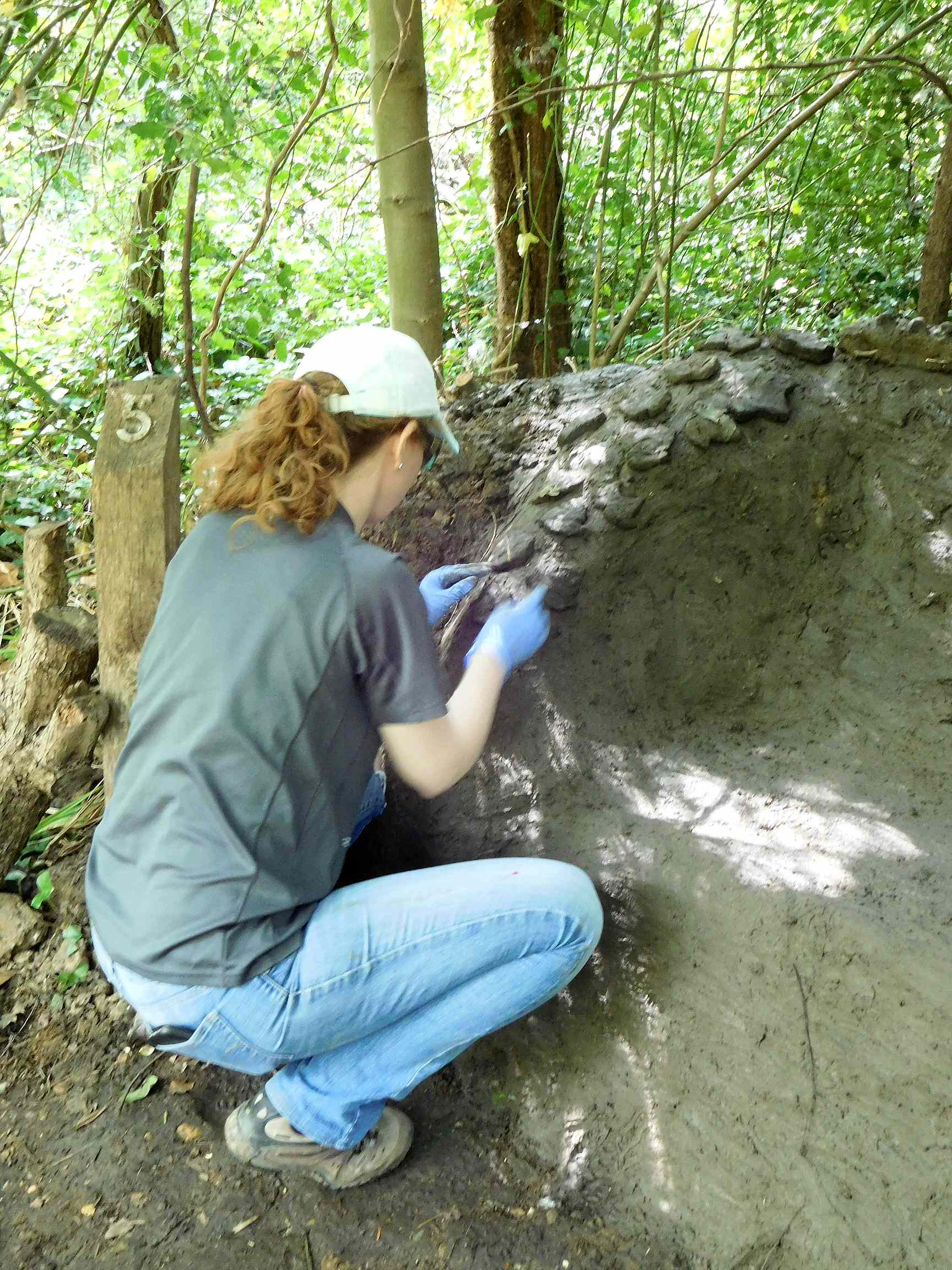
Ivy leaf decoration for mud sofa

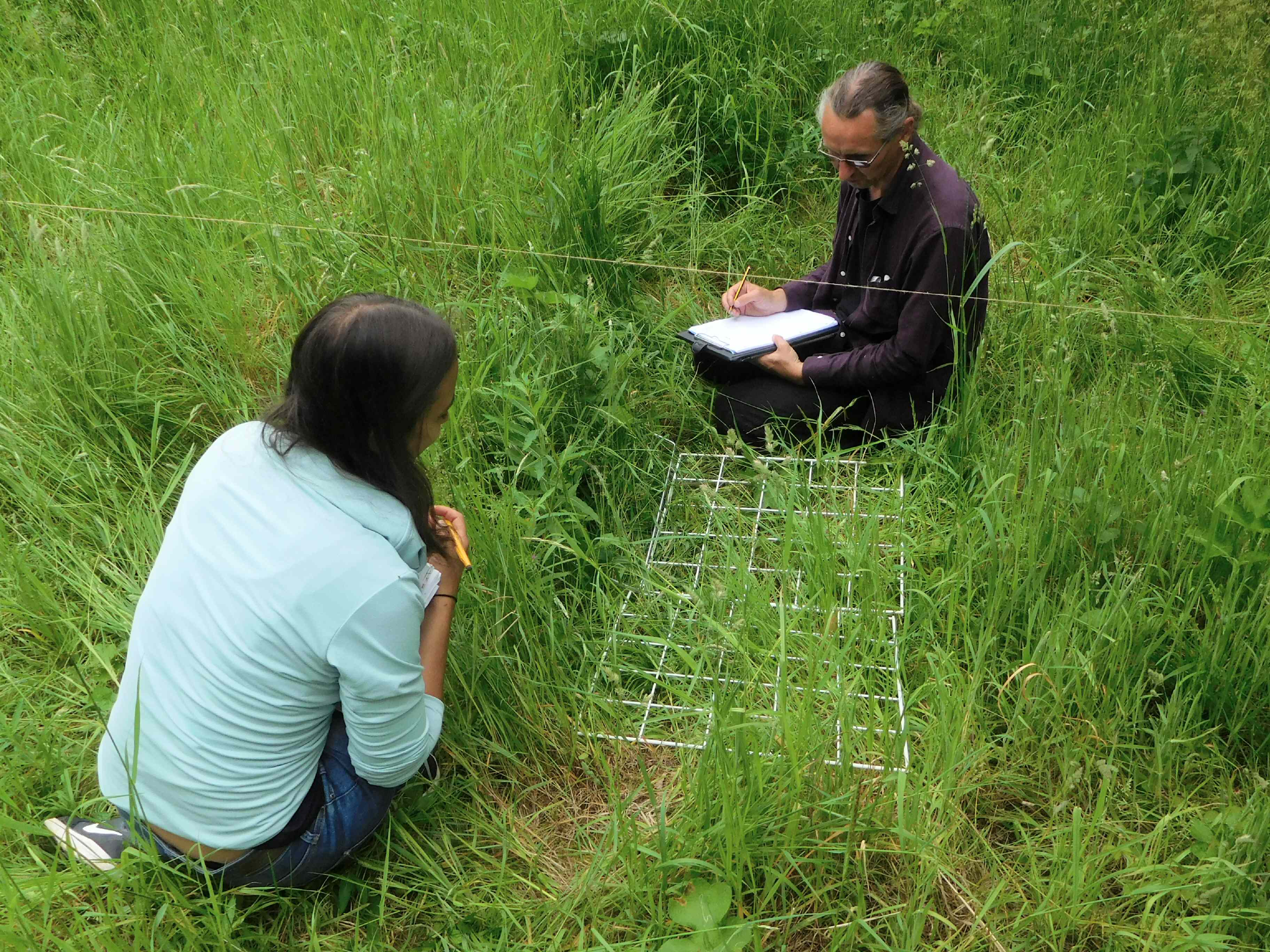
LWT ecologist Tony Wileman on a transect survey of the plants in the anthill meadow

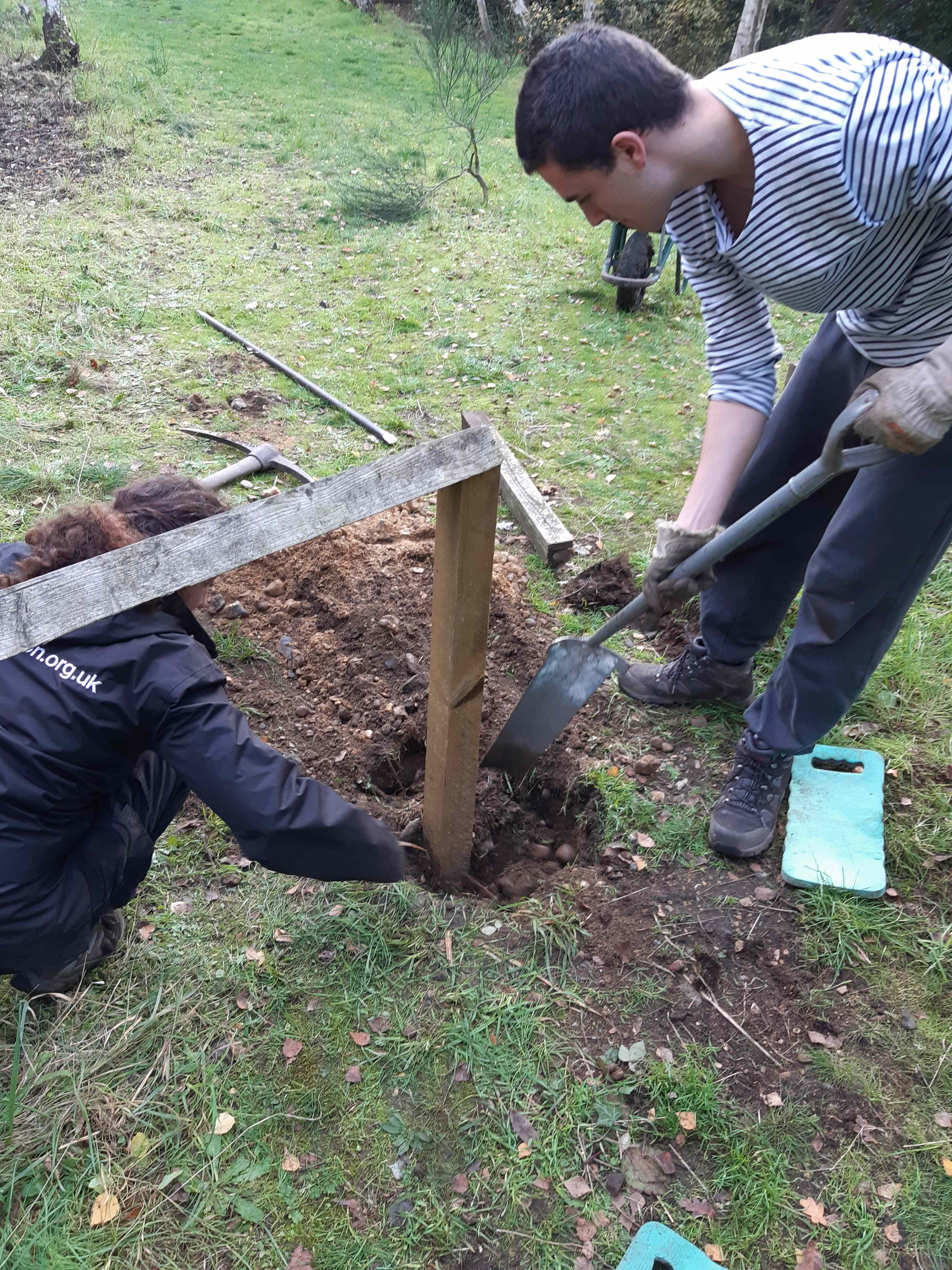
Replacing a post in anthill meadow fence

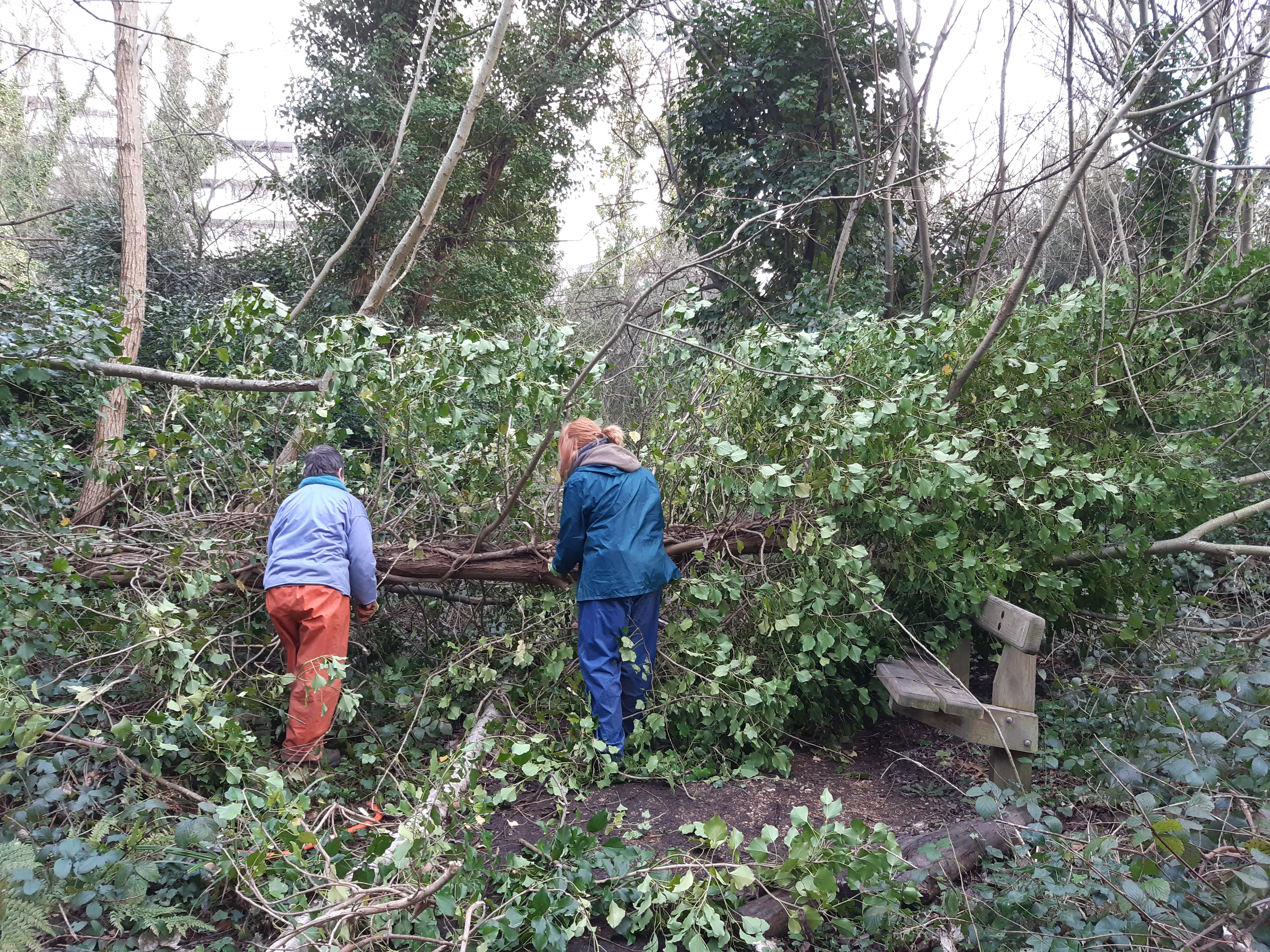
Volunteers cutting brash from a willow tree, felled across a path and bench by Storm Ciara

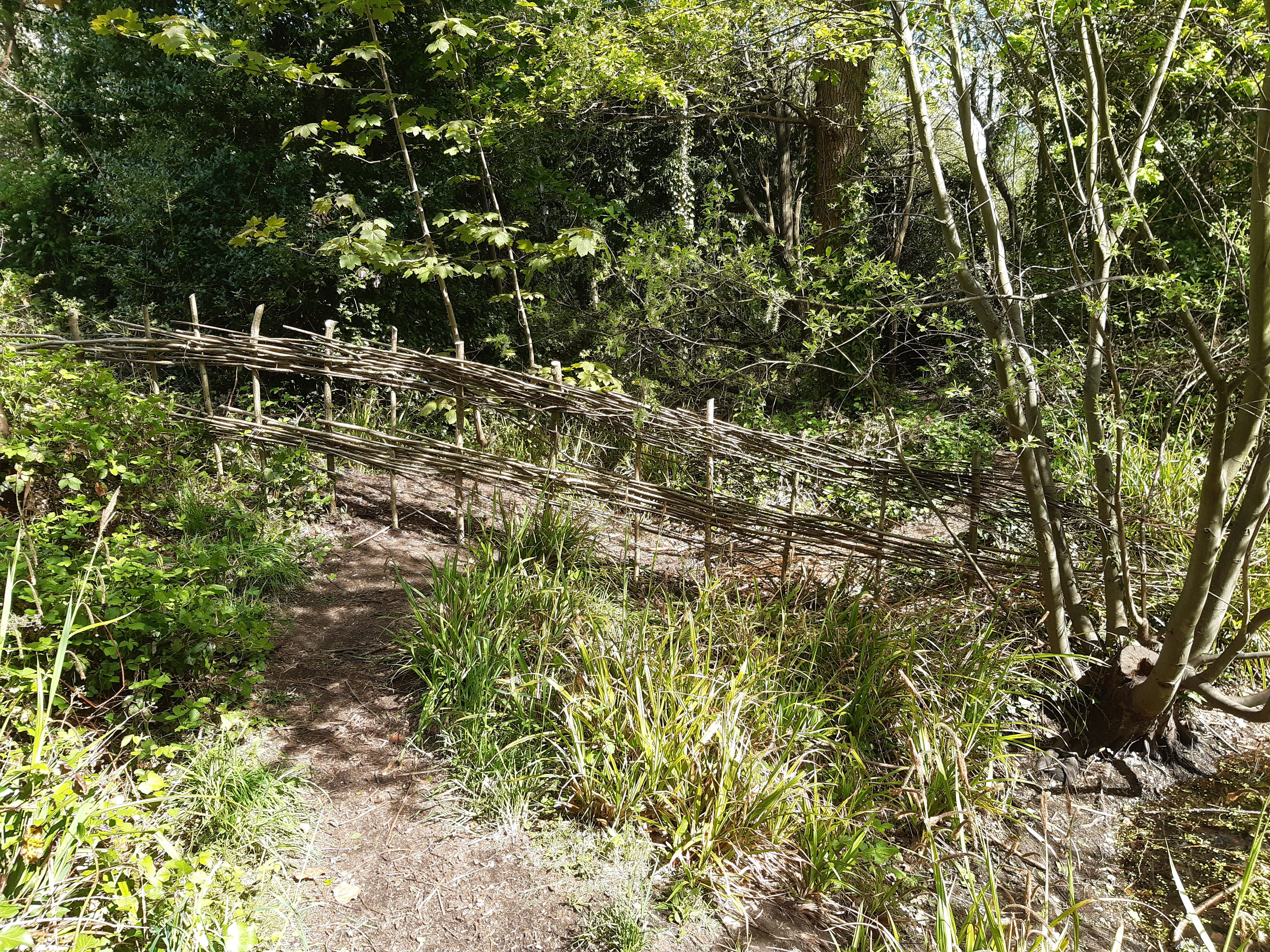
Woven hazel deadhedge behind pond, blocking informal paths that formed during the COVID-19 lockdowns

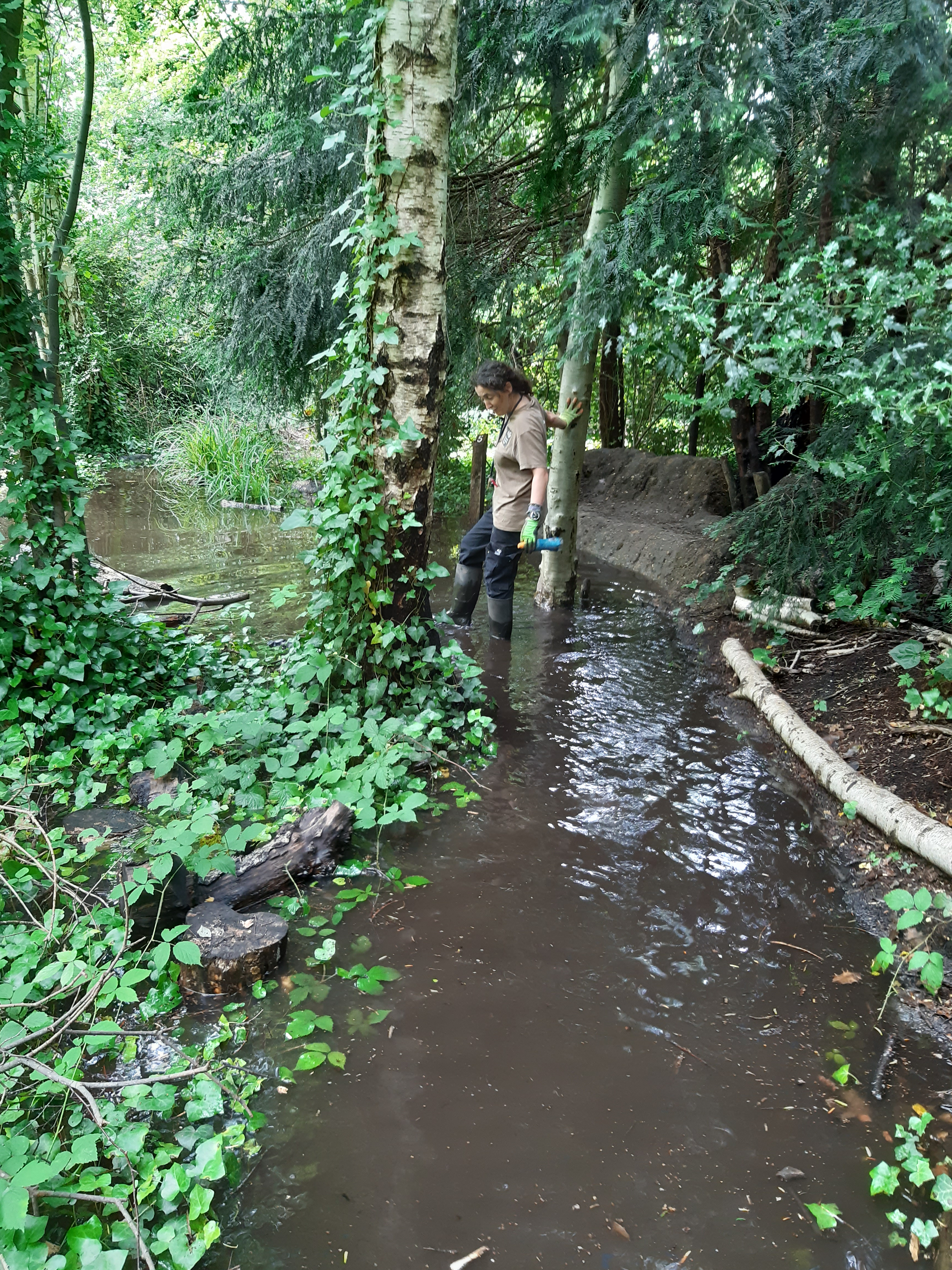
Flash flooding of path by mud bench after thunderstorm in July 2021; this path has never flooded before.

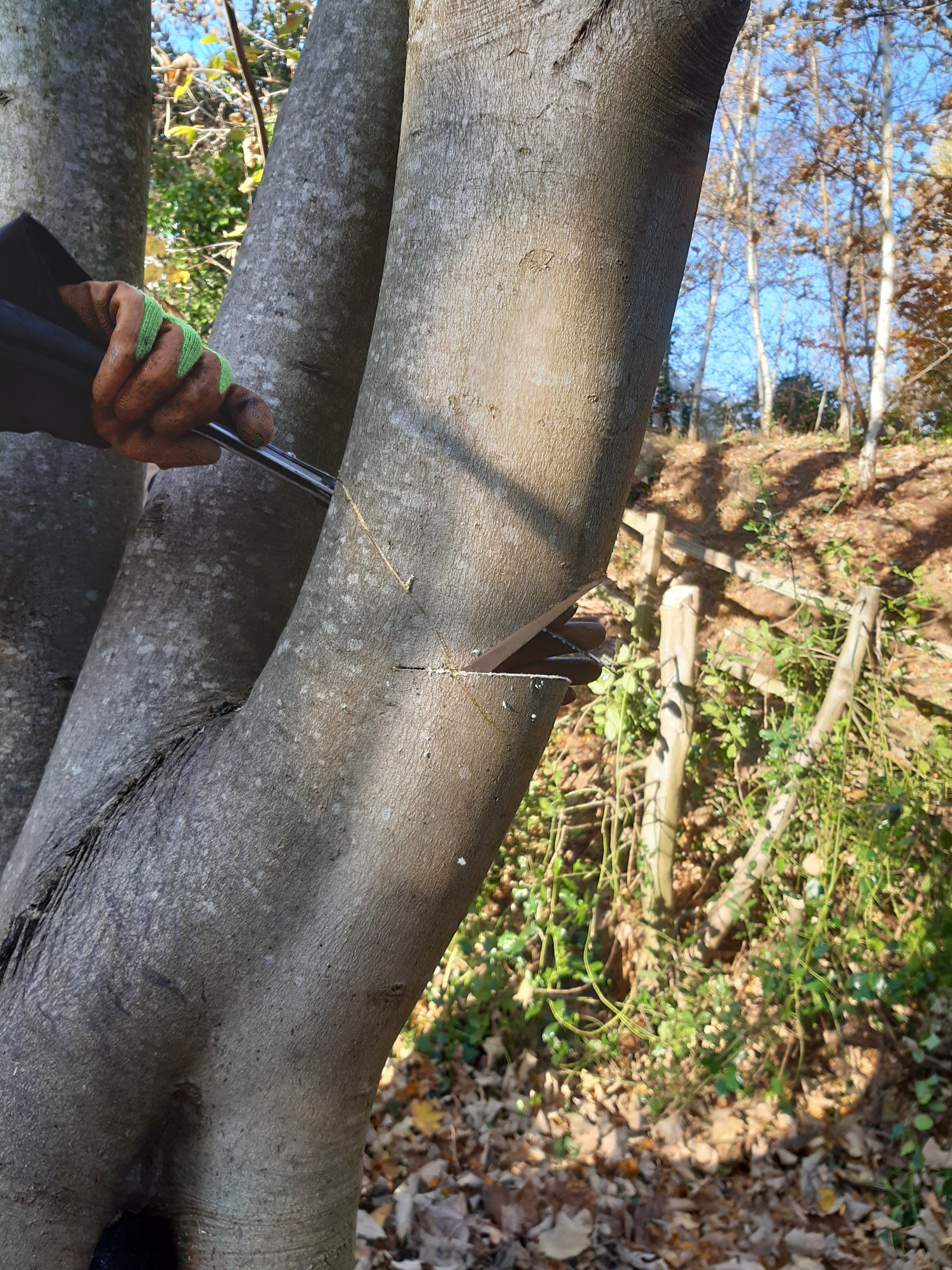
Coppicing sycamore – cutting into bird's mouth

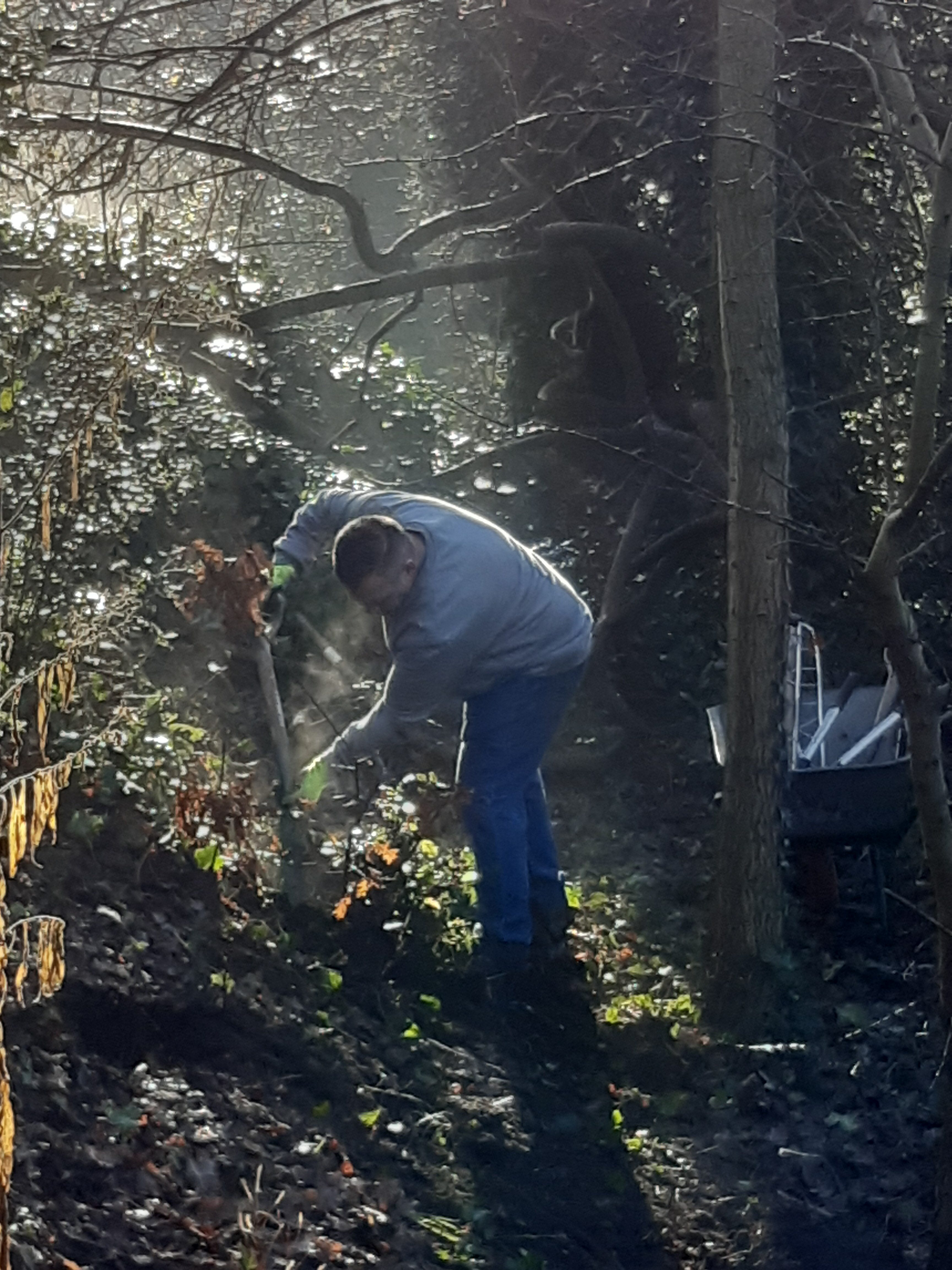
Digging out holm oak stumps

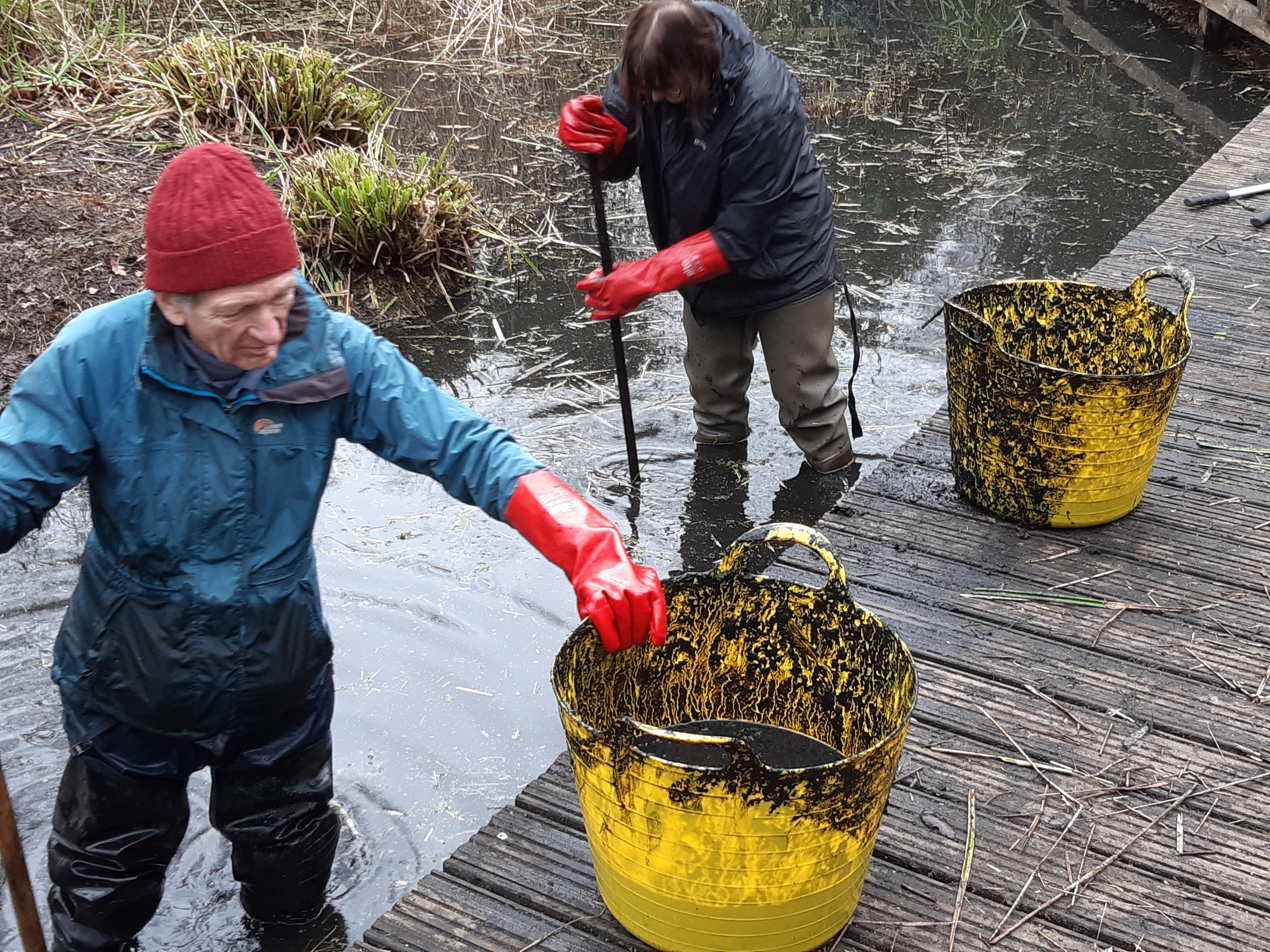
Scooping mud from the pond

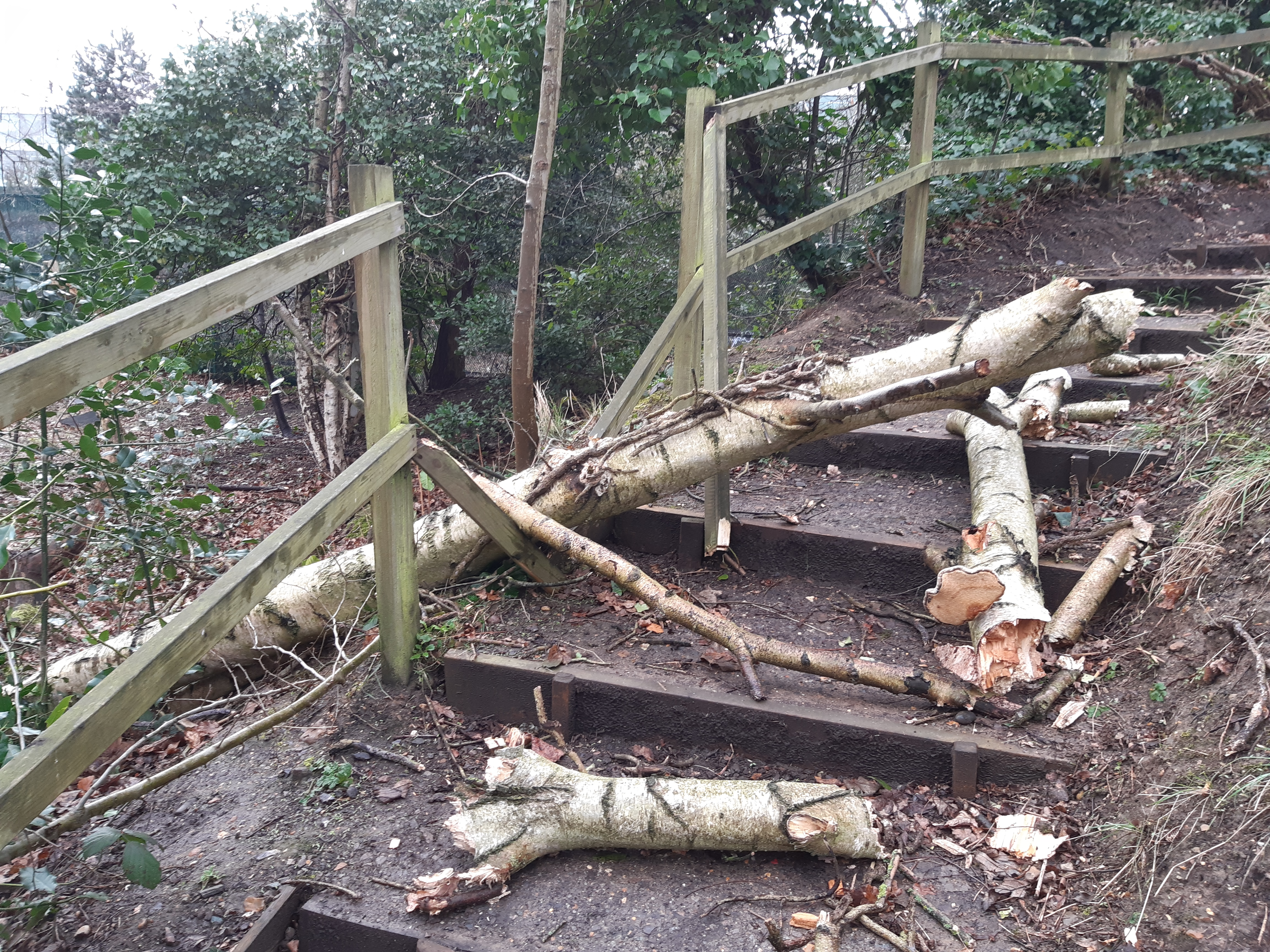
Storm Eunice fells dead birch across fence, February 2022

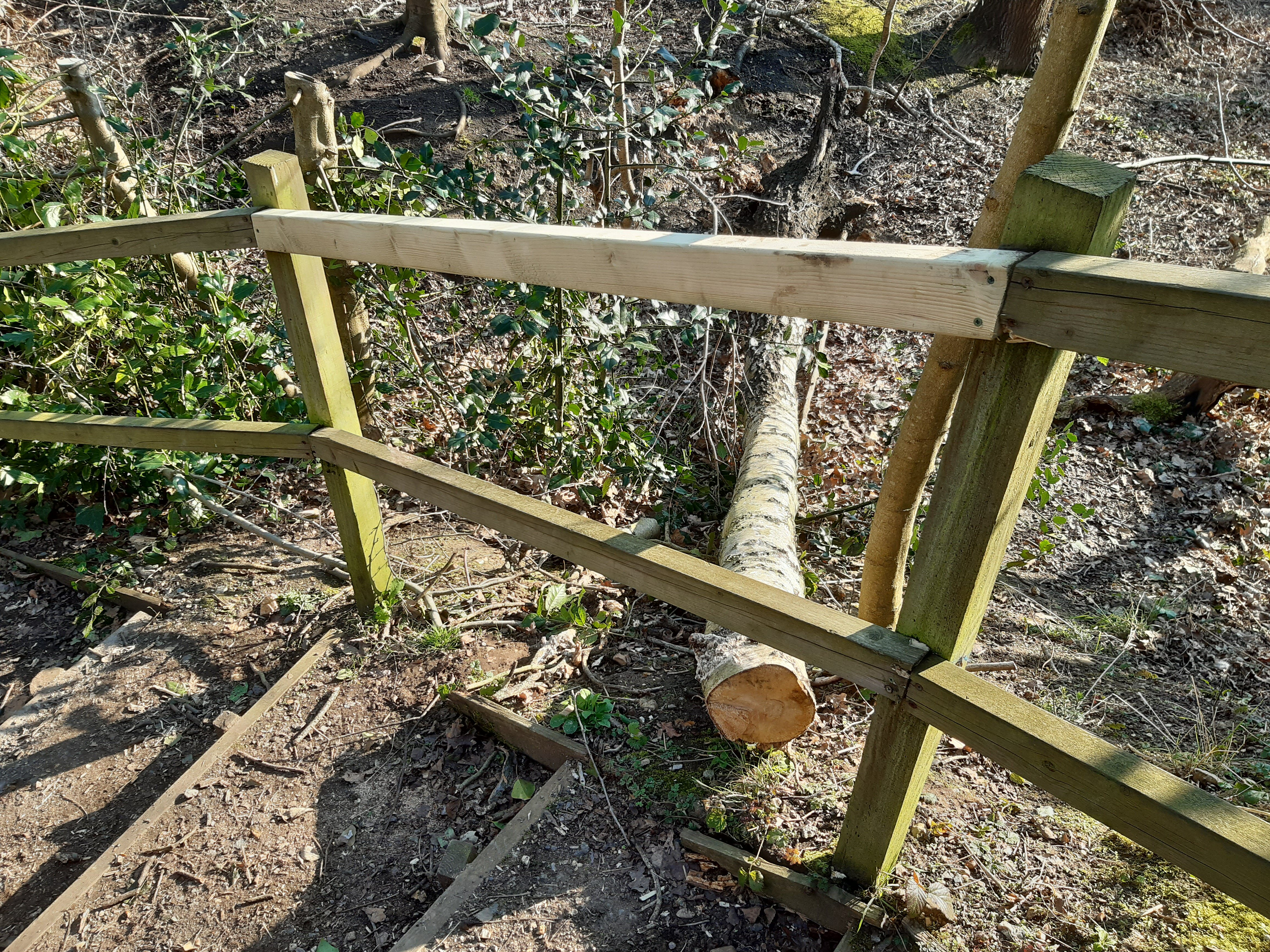
Repaired rail on mound above birch felled by Storm Eunice

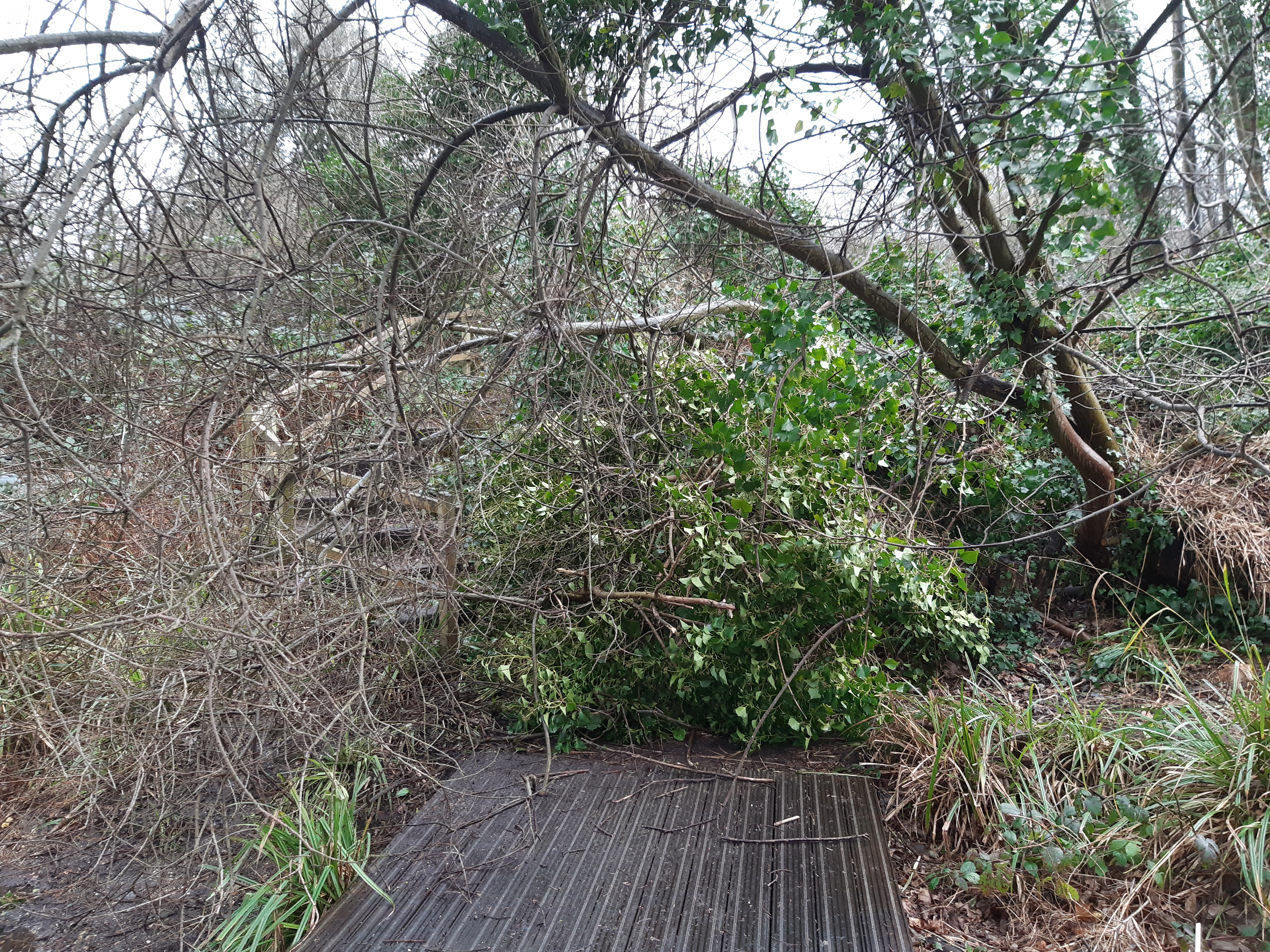
Storm Eunice blocks boardwalk with ivy and willow

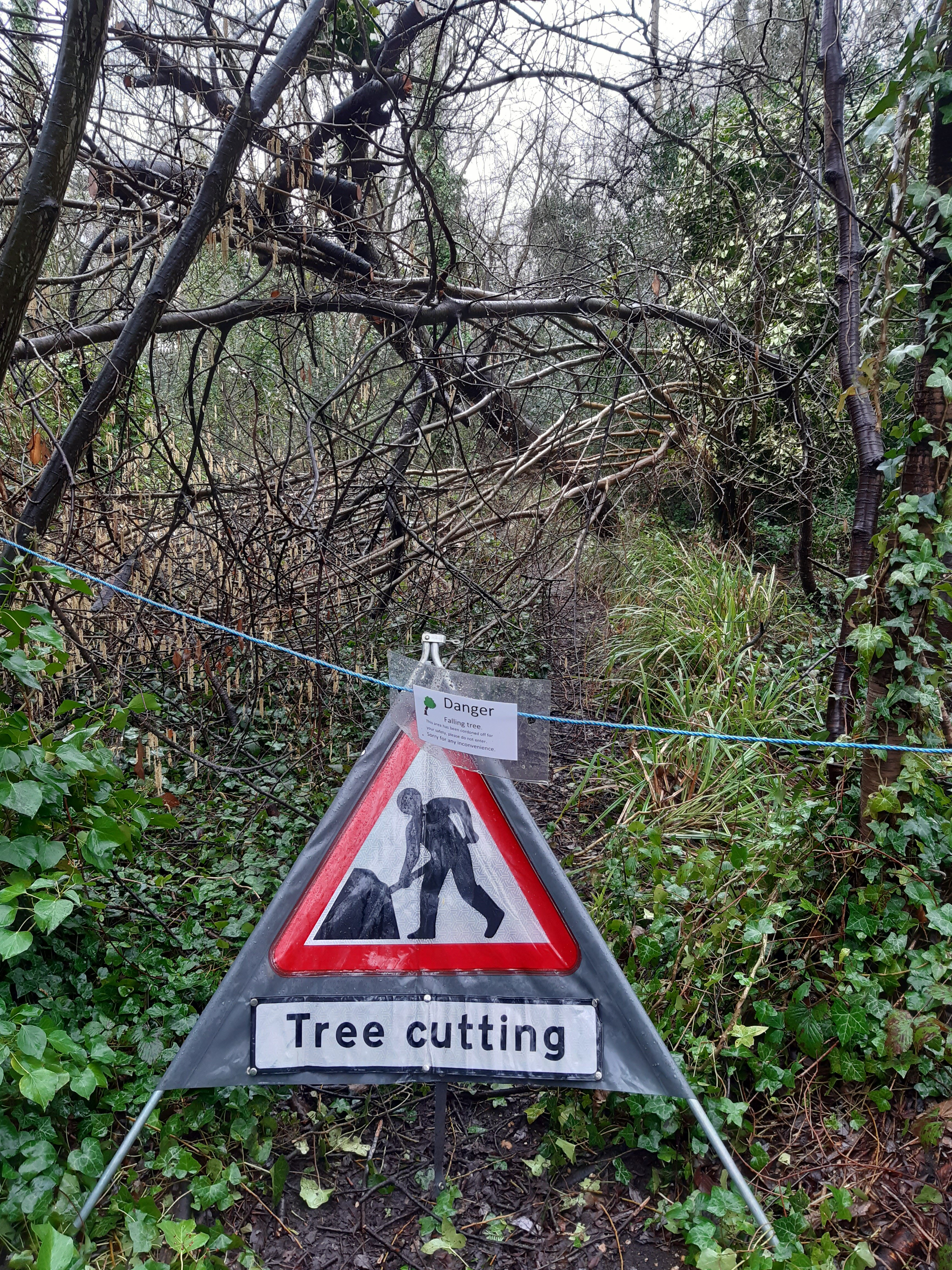
Large cherry tree, hazels fallen and lodged on other trees after Storm Franklin

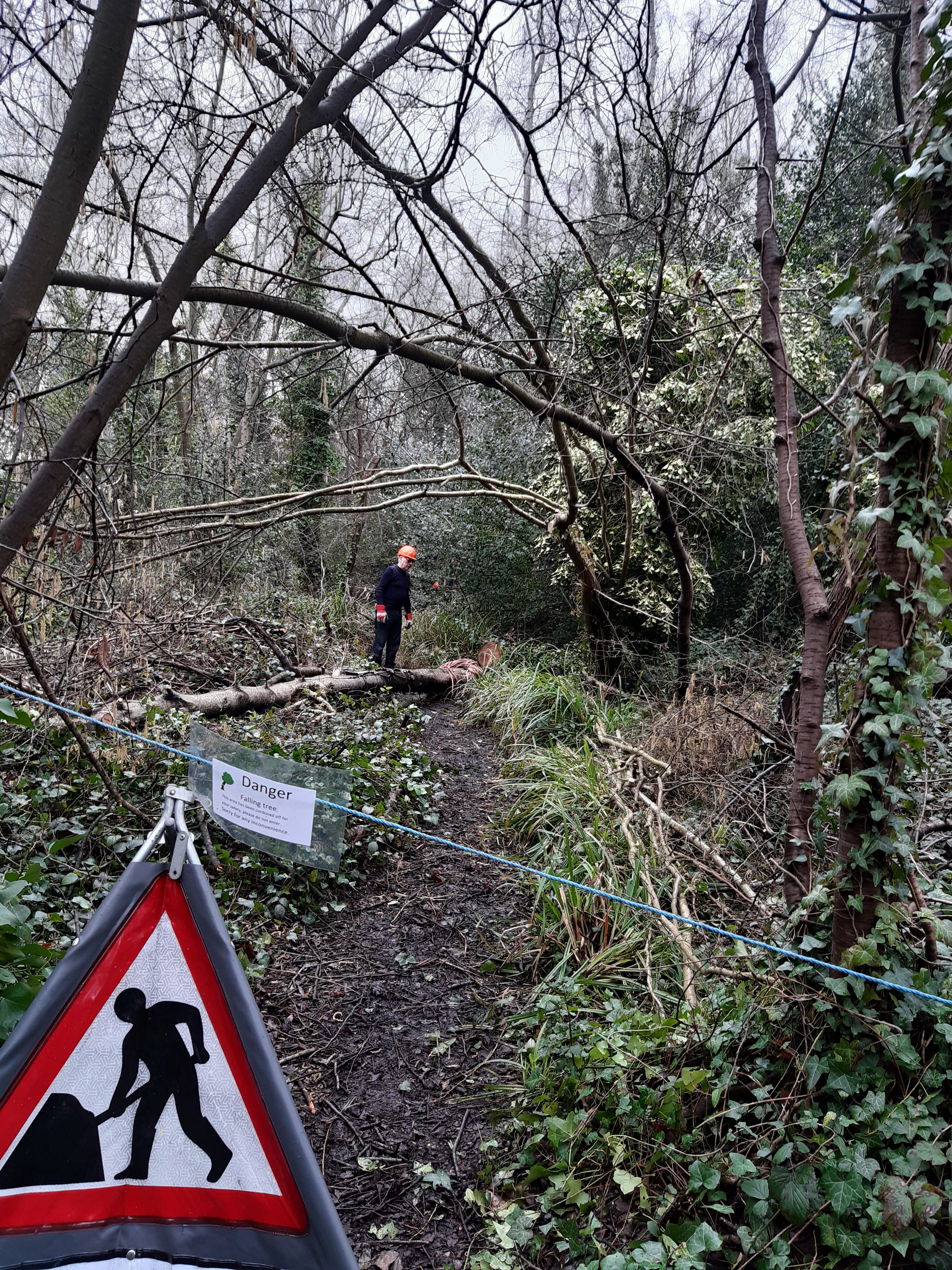
Large cherry tree, hazels cut after falling and lodging in other trees after Storm Franklin

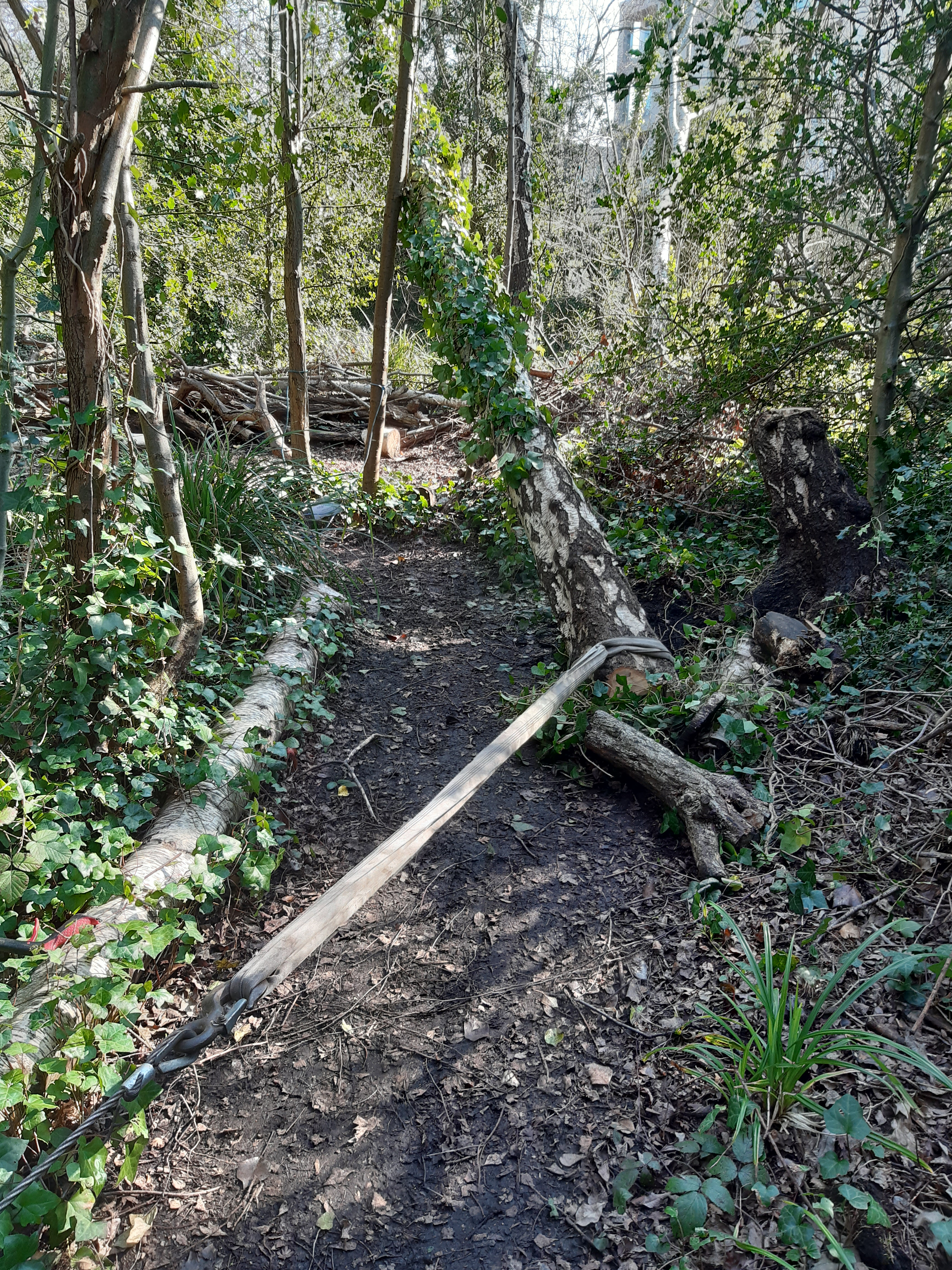
Winching strop around base of lodged Birch trunk, ready to pull

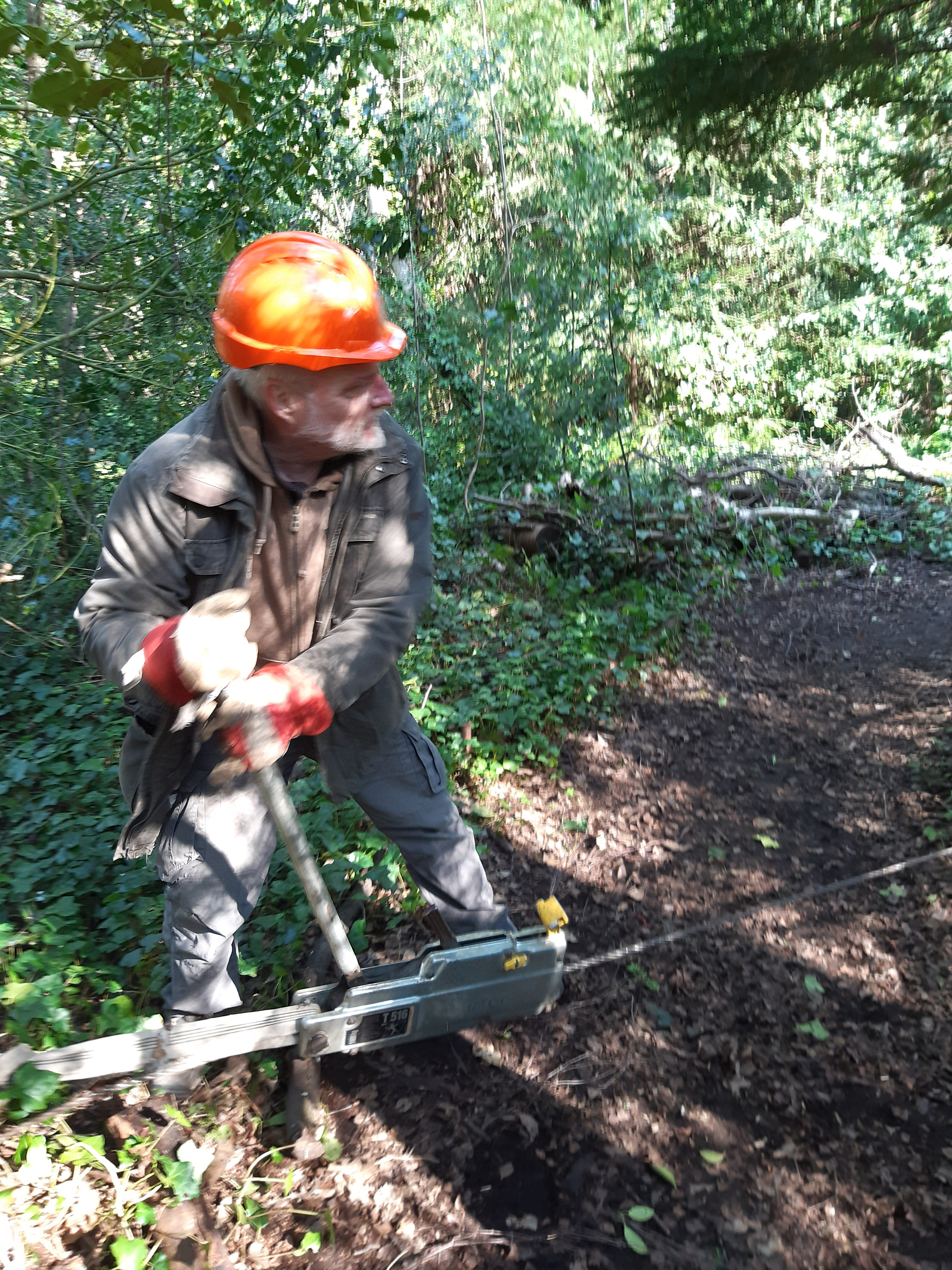
Winching a lodged Birch tree trunk down to ground

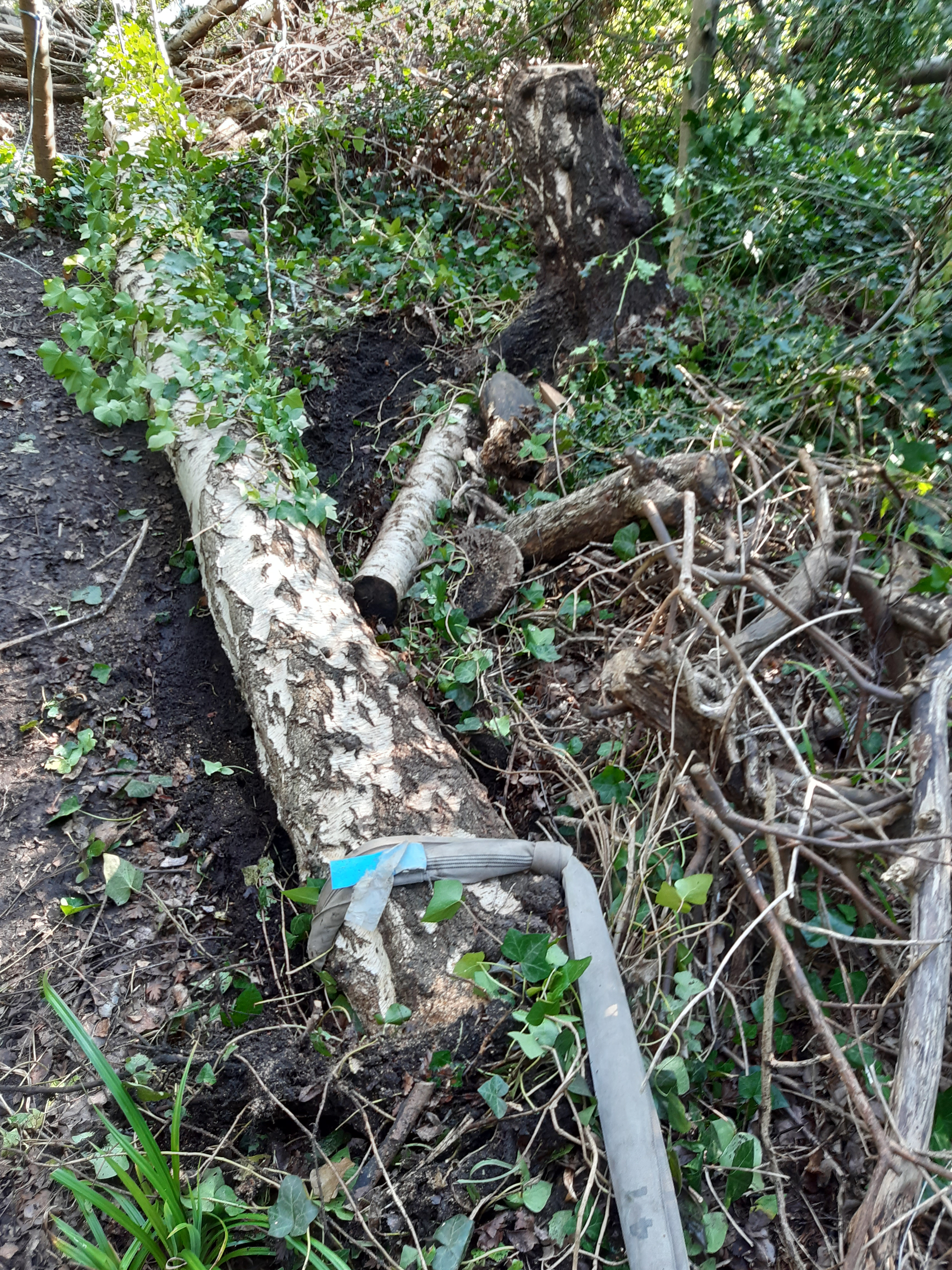
Lodged Birch trunk winched down to earth; gouged furrow shows how far it has been pulled

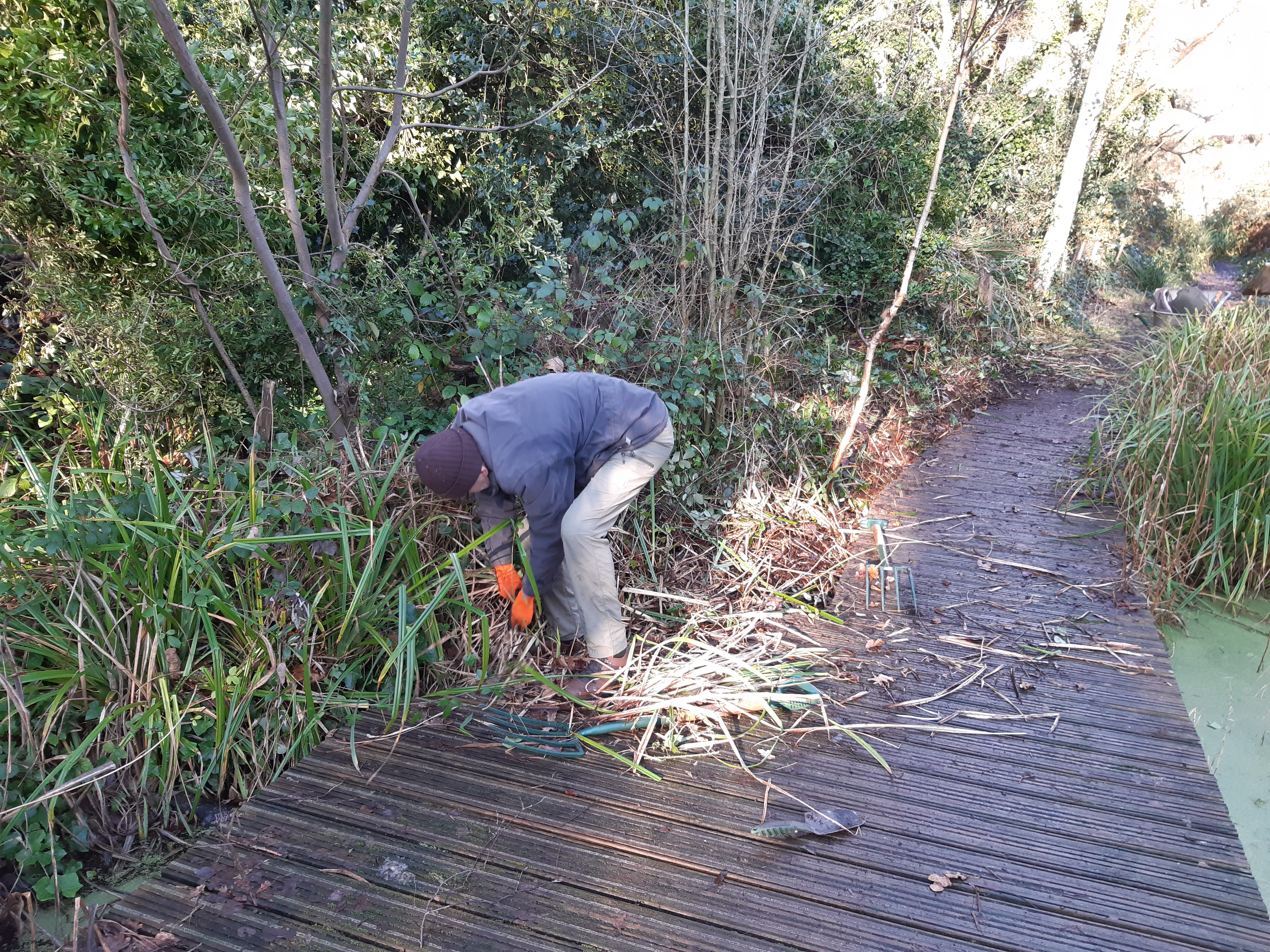
Digging sedge from boardwalk

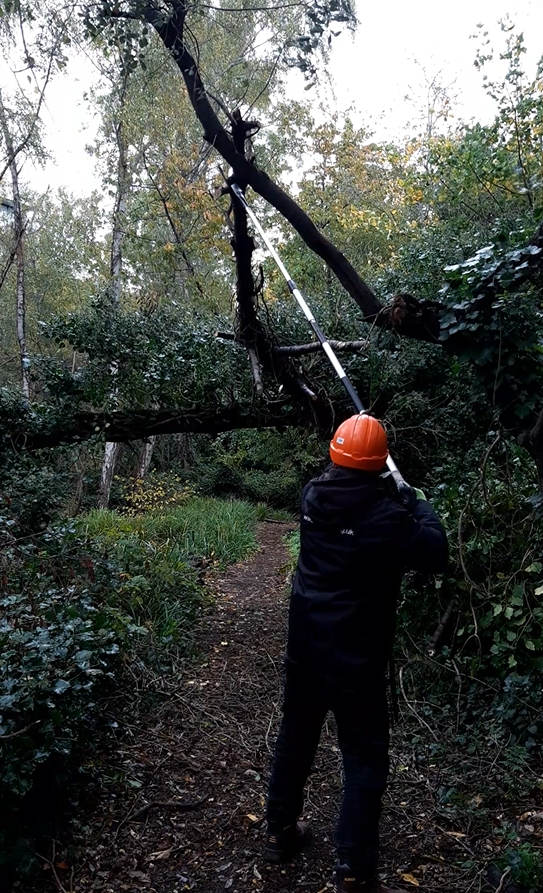
Cutting lodged willow with polesaw

==== Education and public outreach ====
Education and public outreach activity photographs
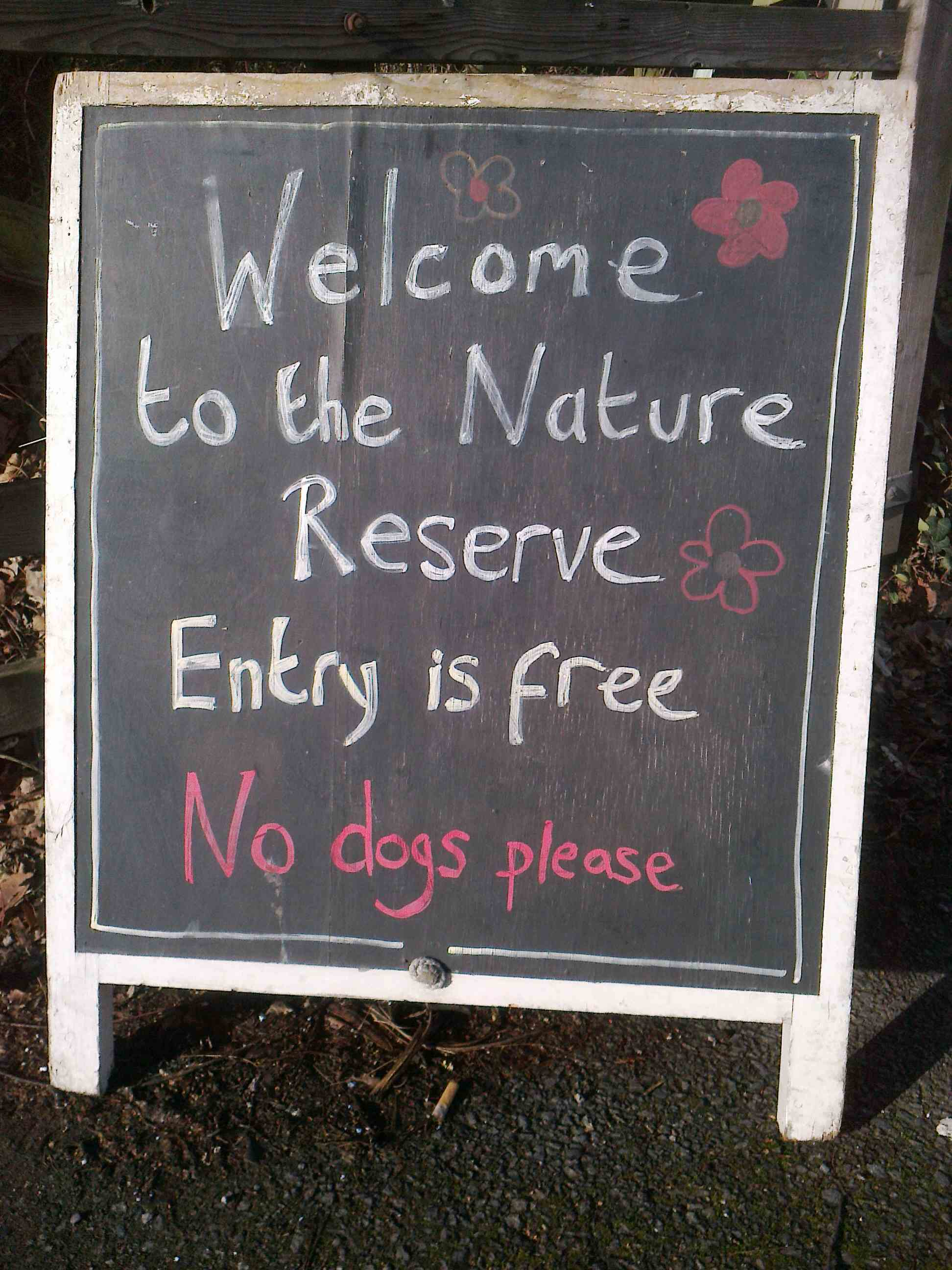
The welcome blackboard

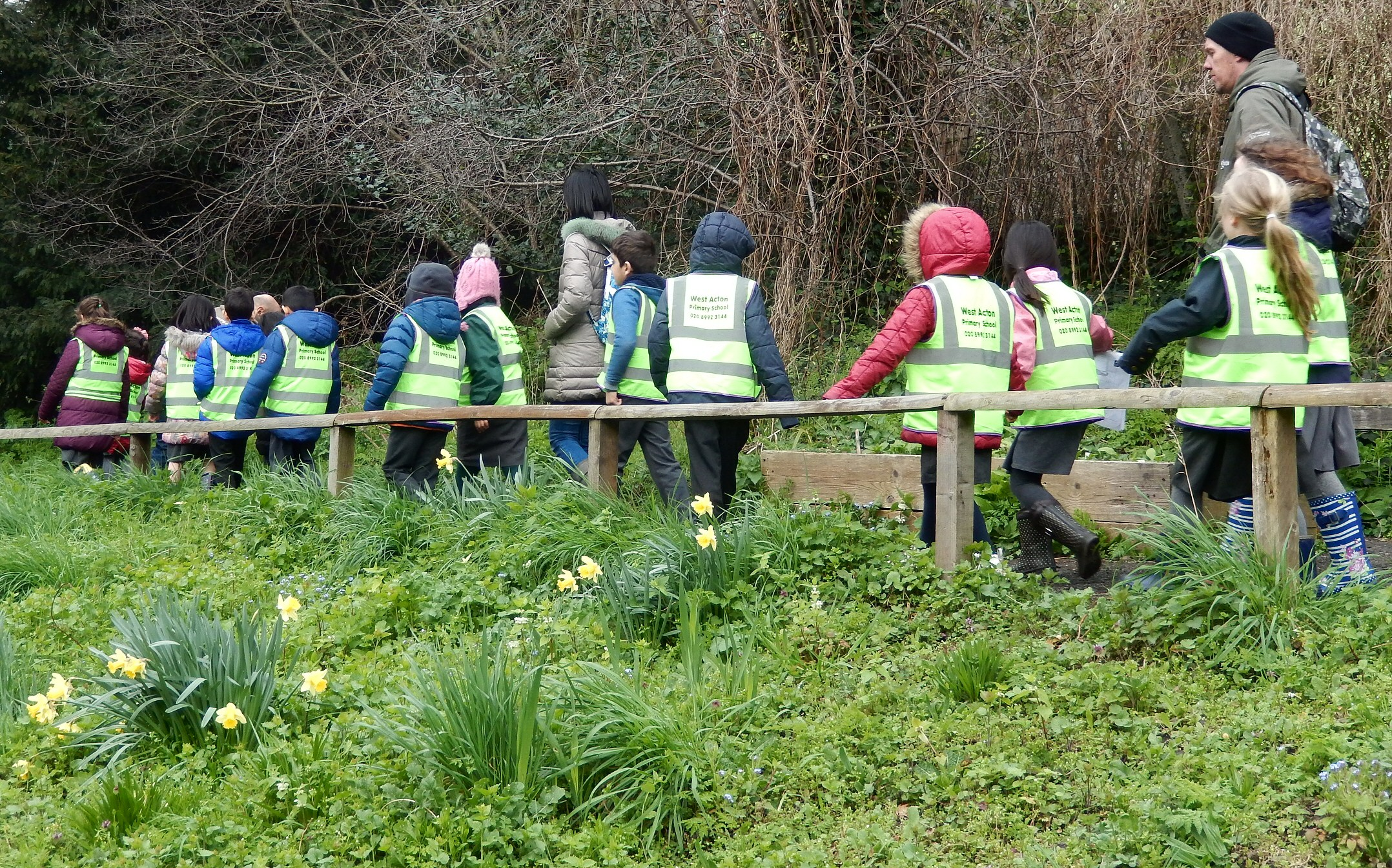
School visit in springtime

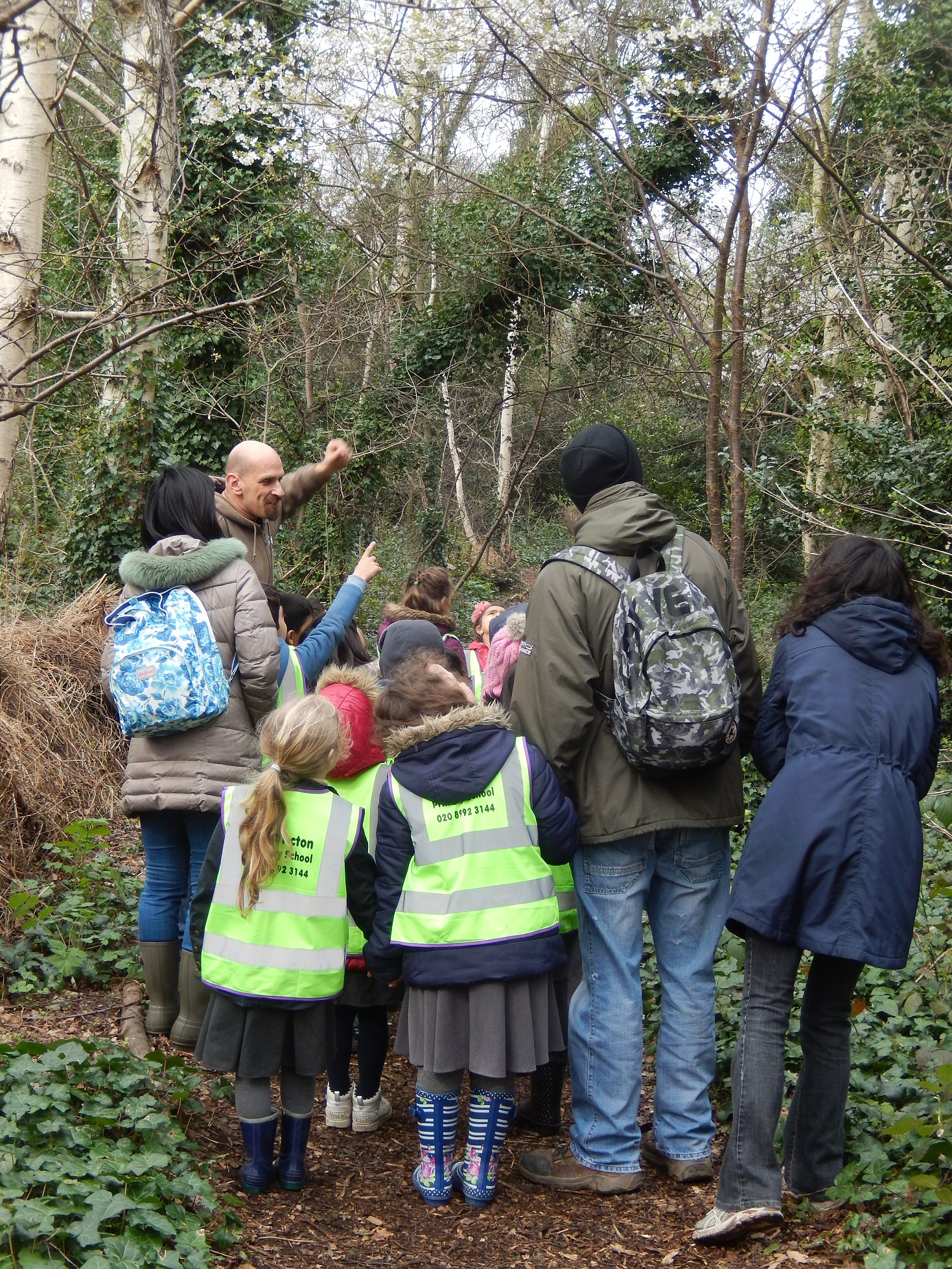
Education officer asks a question

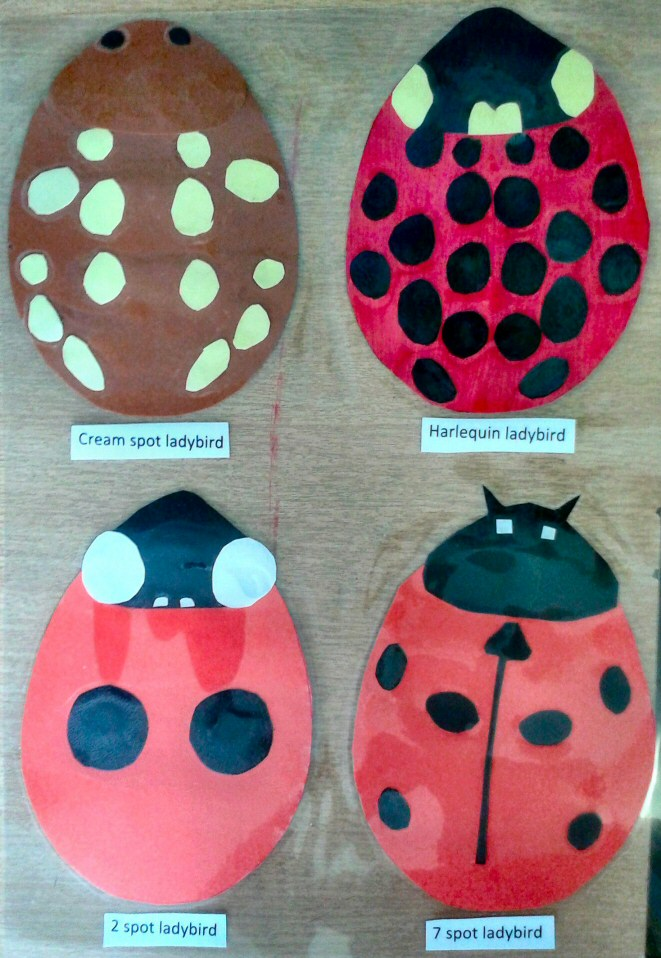
Card cutout ladybirds for children's nature trail on an Open Day

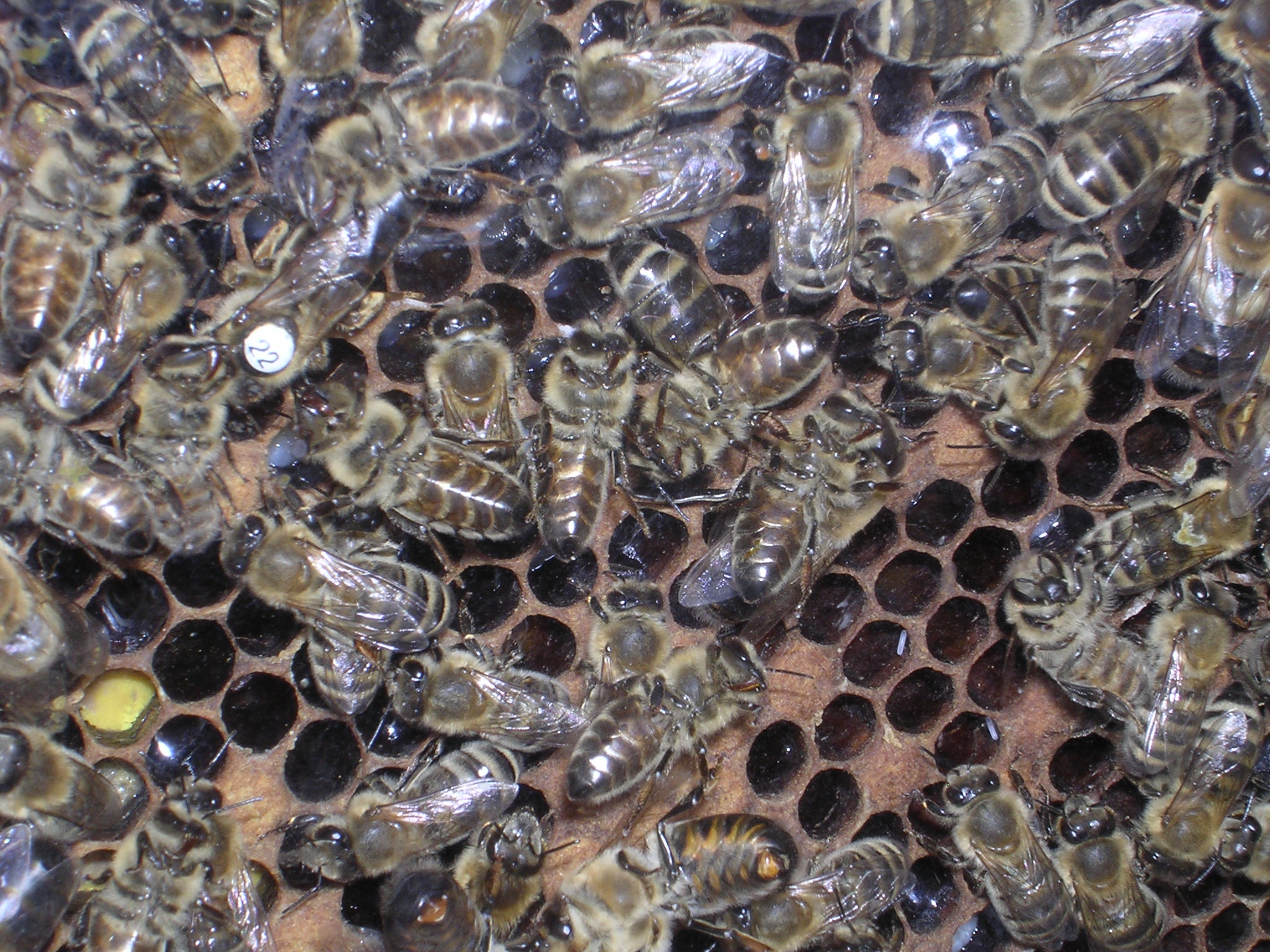
Demonstration beehive with numbered queen bee on an Open Day

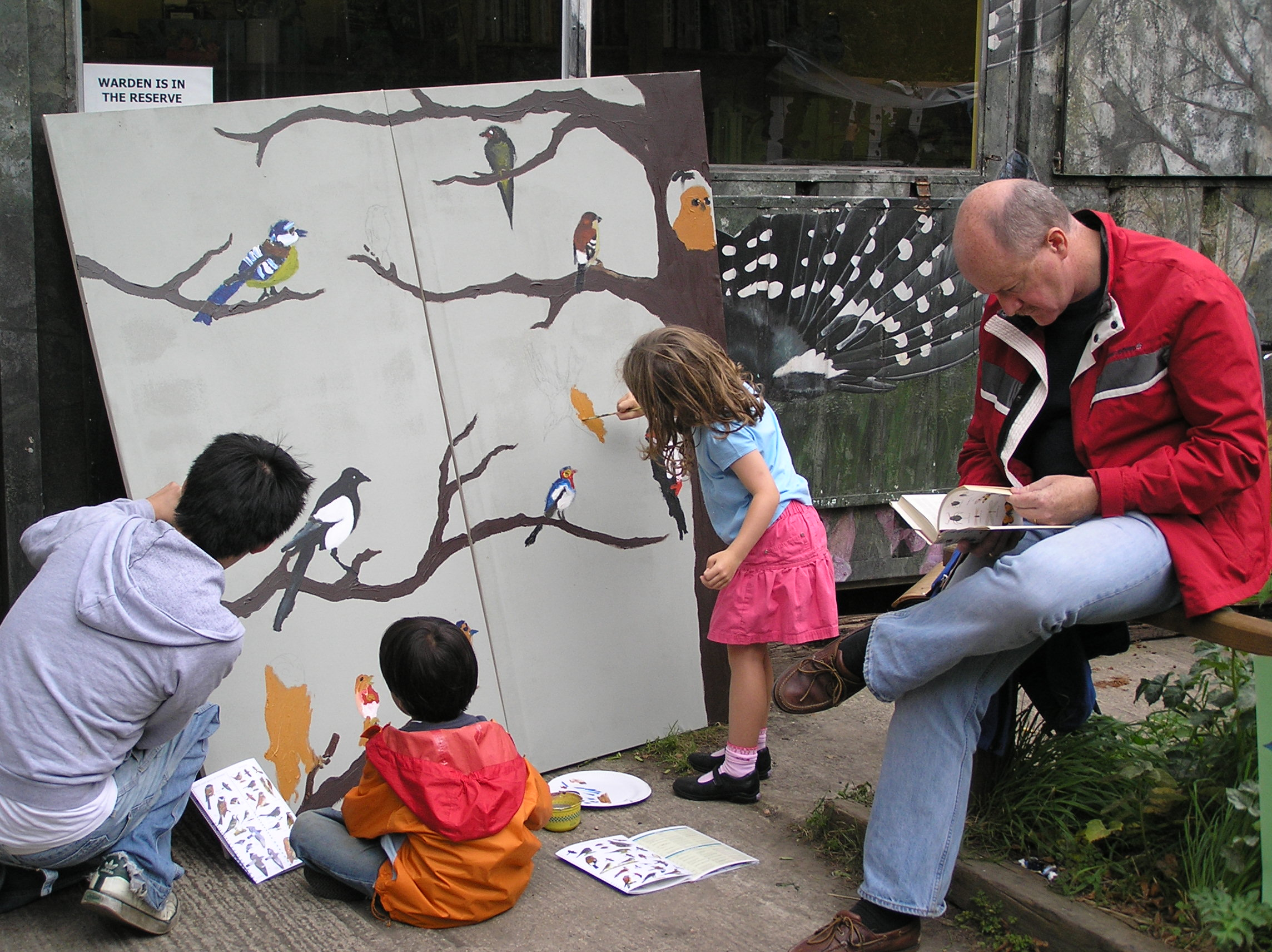
Collaborating on a bird canvas on an Open Day

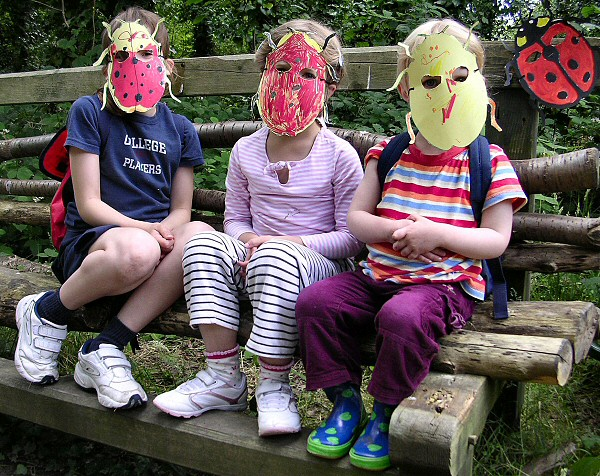
Ladybird masks on an Open Day

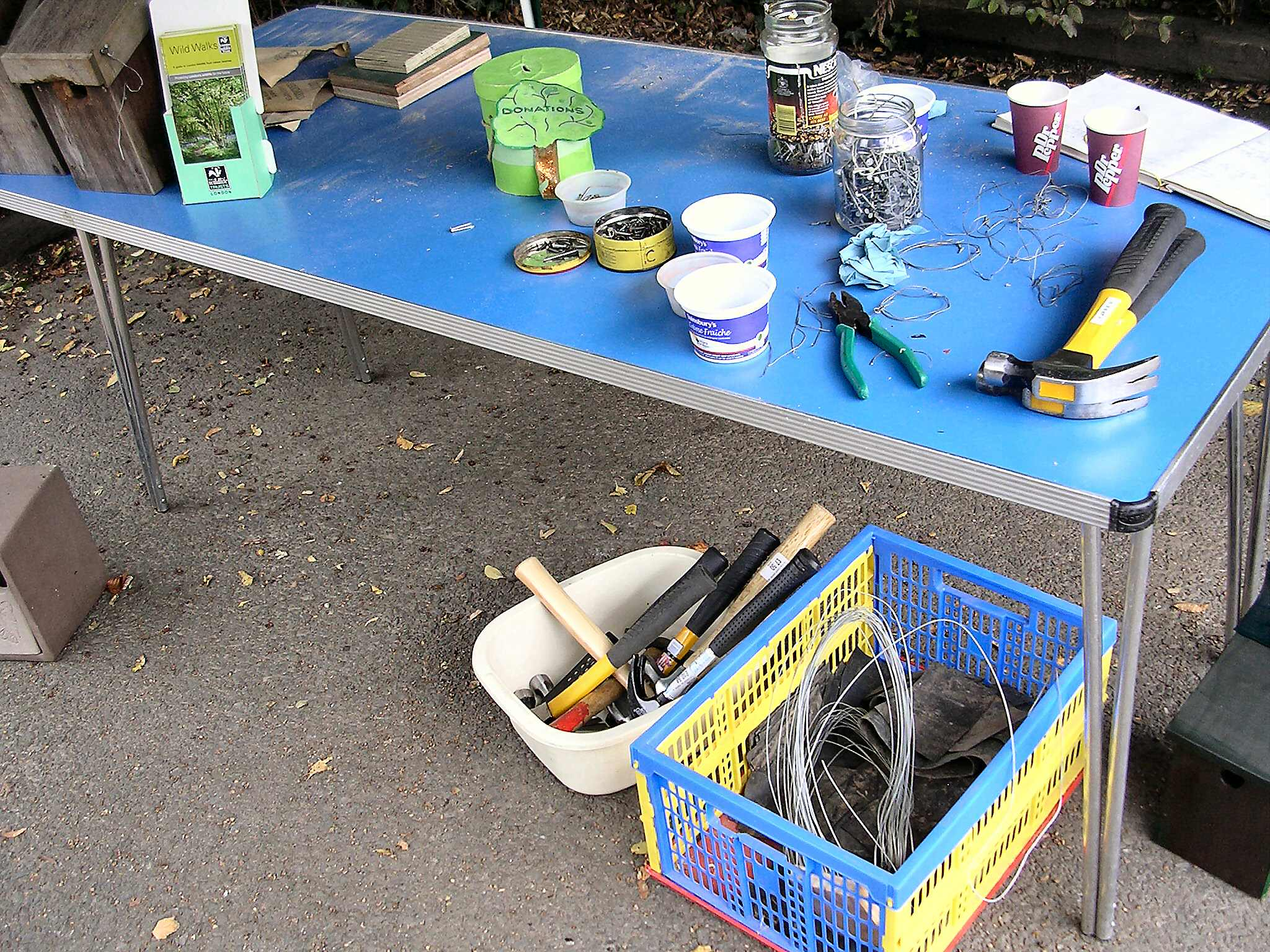
Making birdboxes to take home on an Open Day

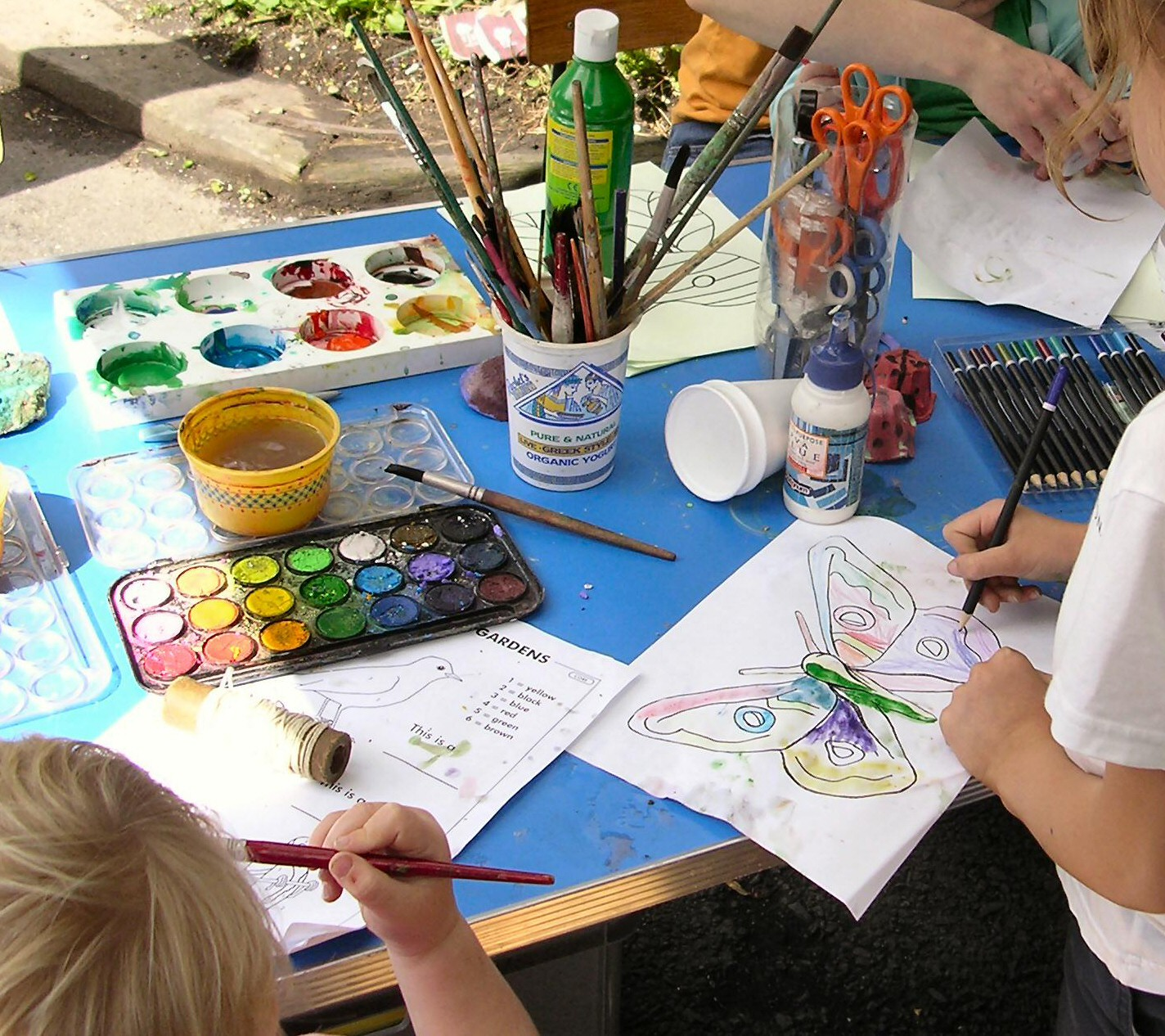
Painting butterflies on an Open Day

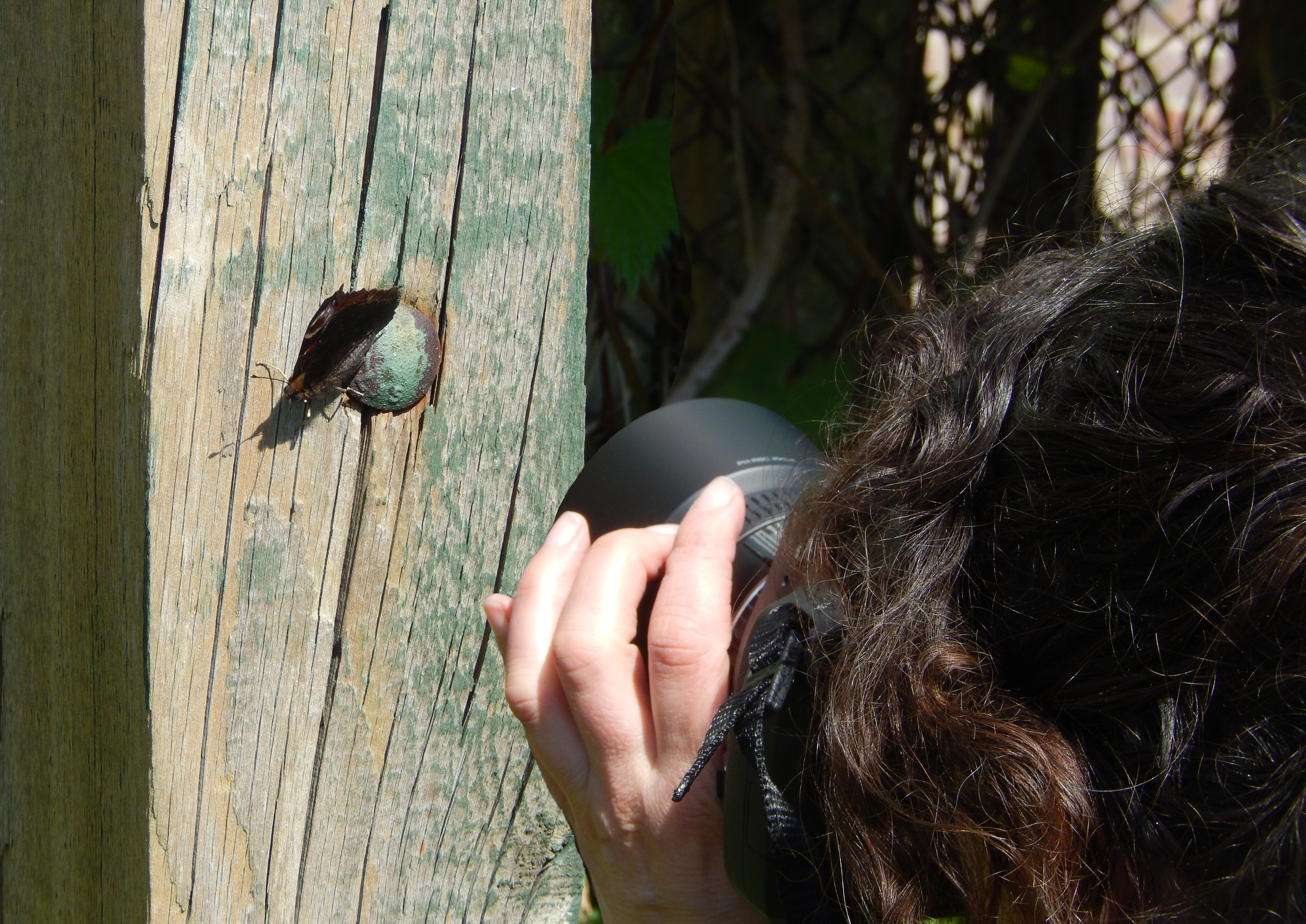
Photographing a freshly-emerged peacock butterfly in spring

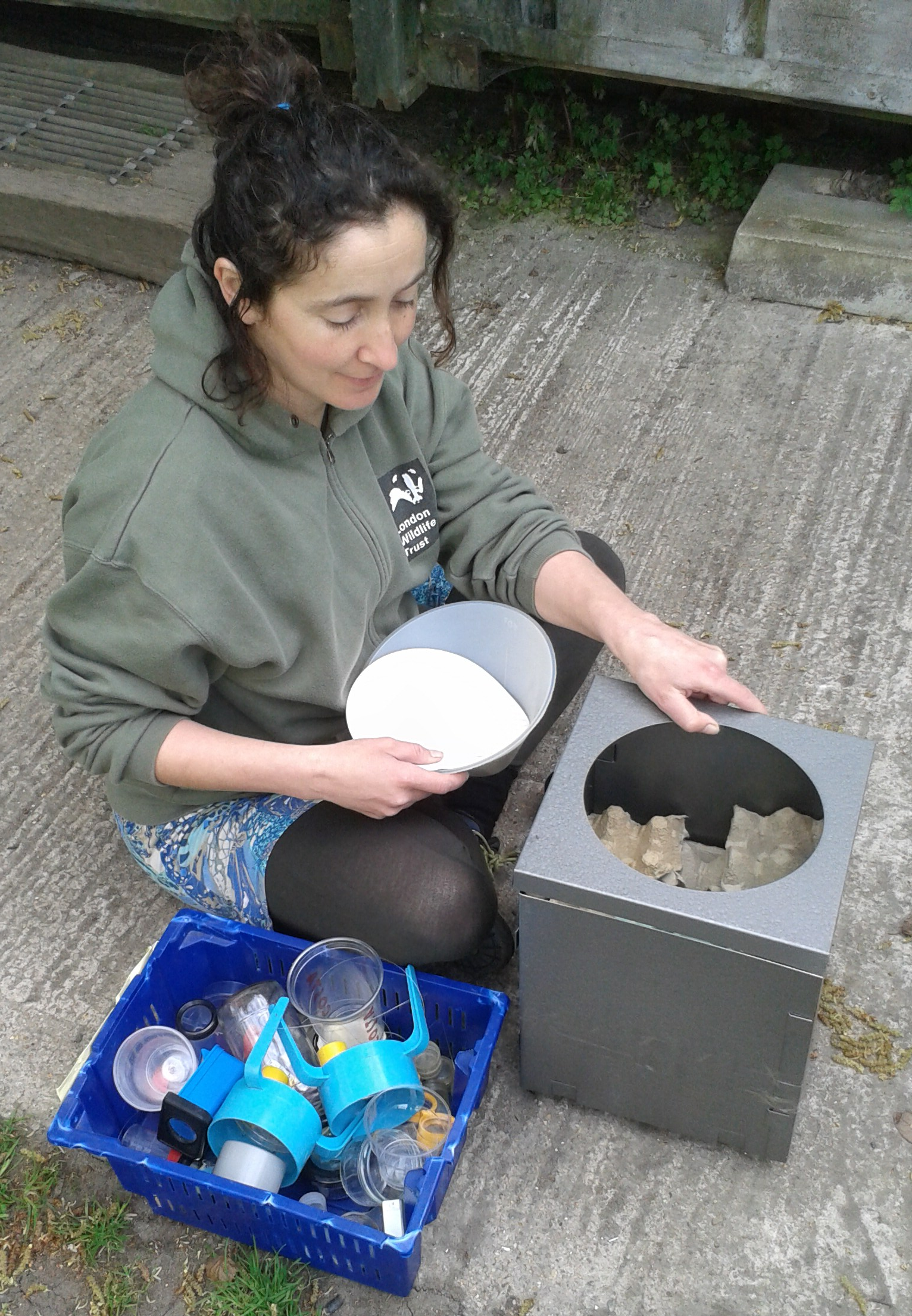
Inspecting the moth trap

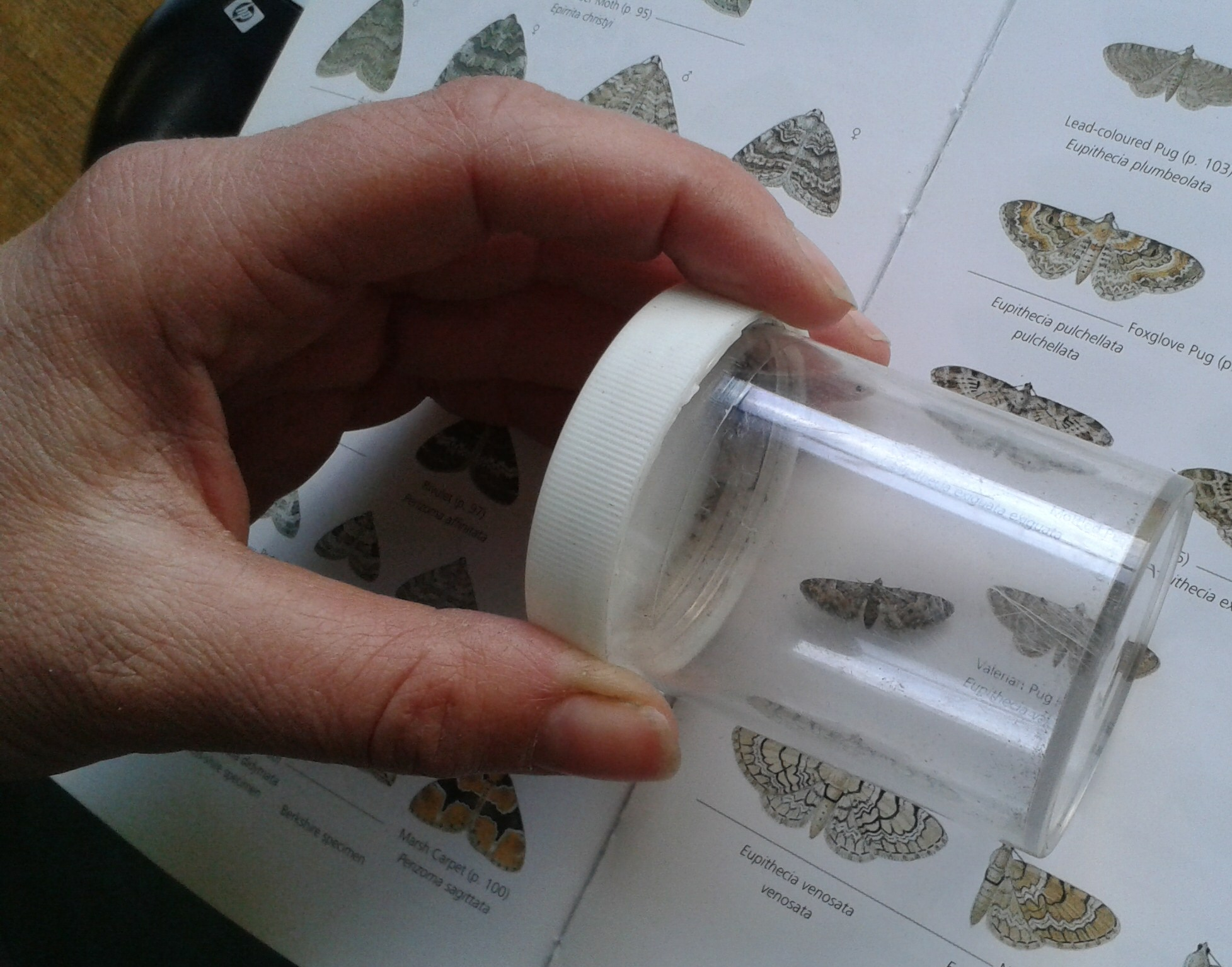
Identifying a pug moth

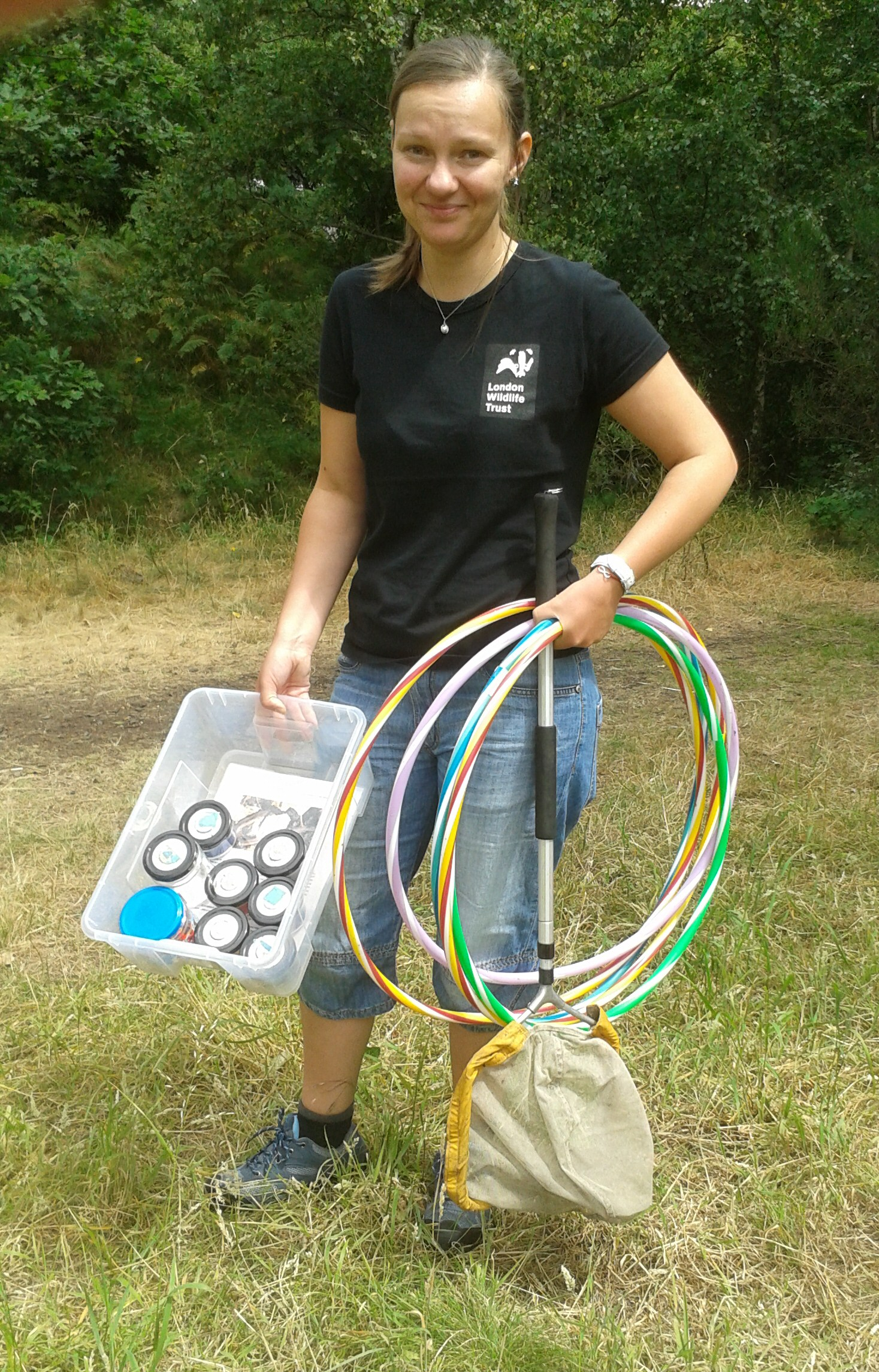
London Wildlife Trust staff with everything you need for pond dipping

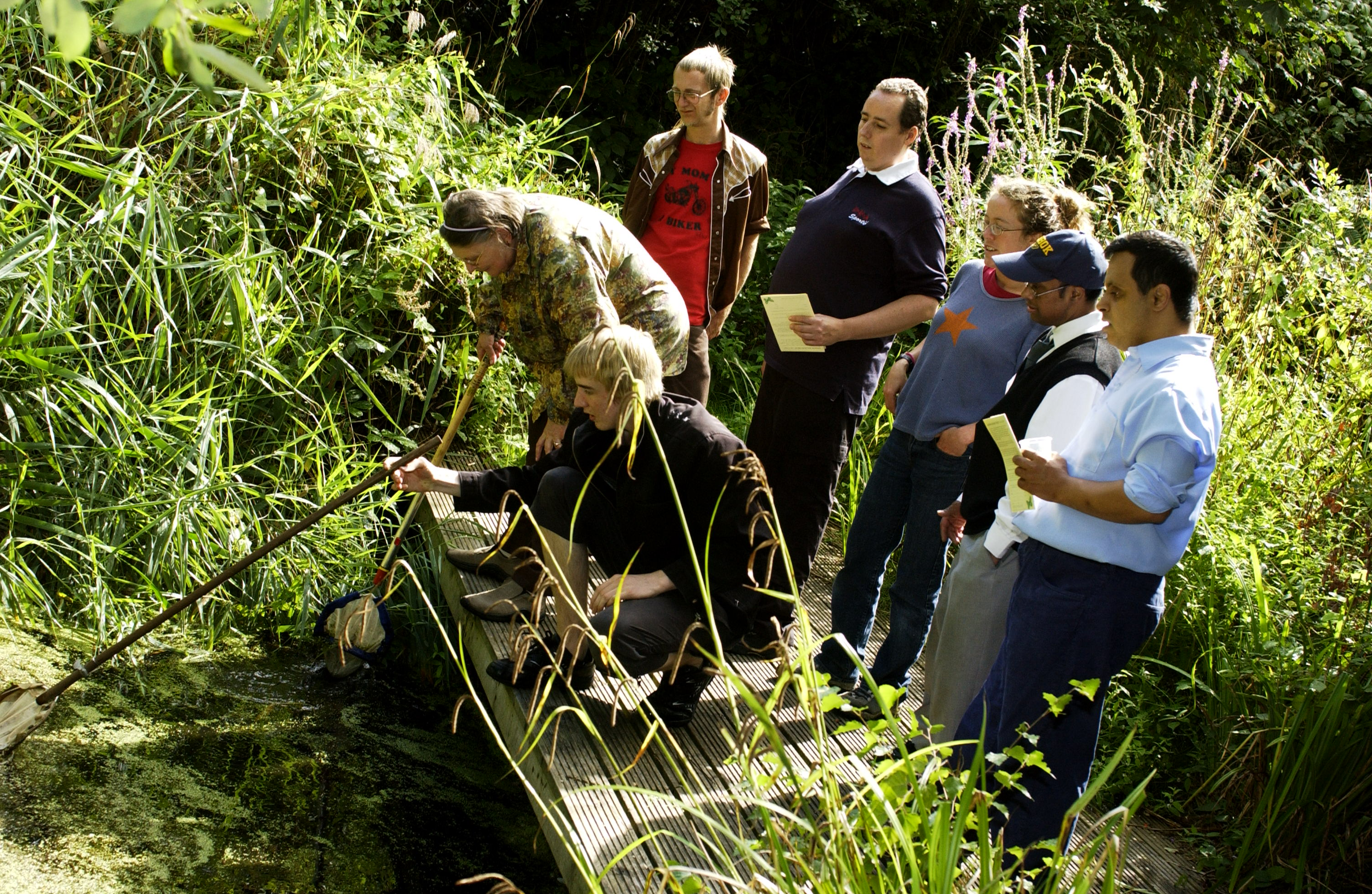
Pond dipping

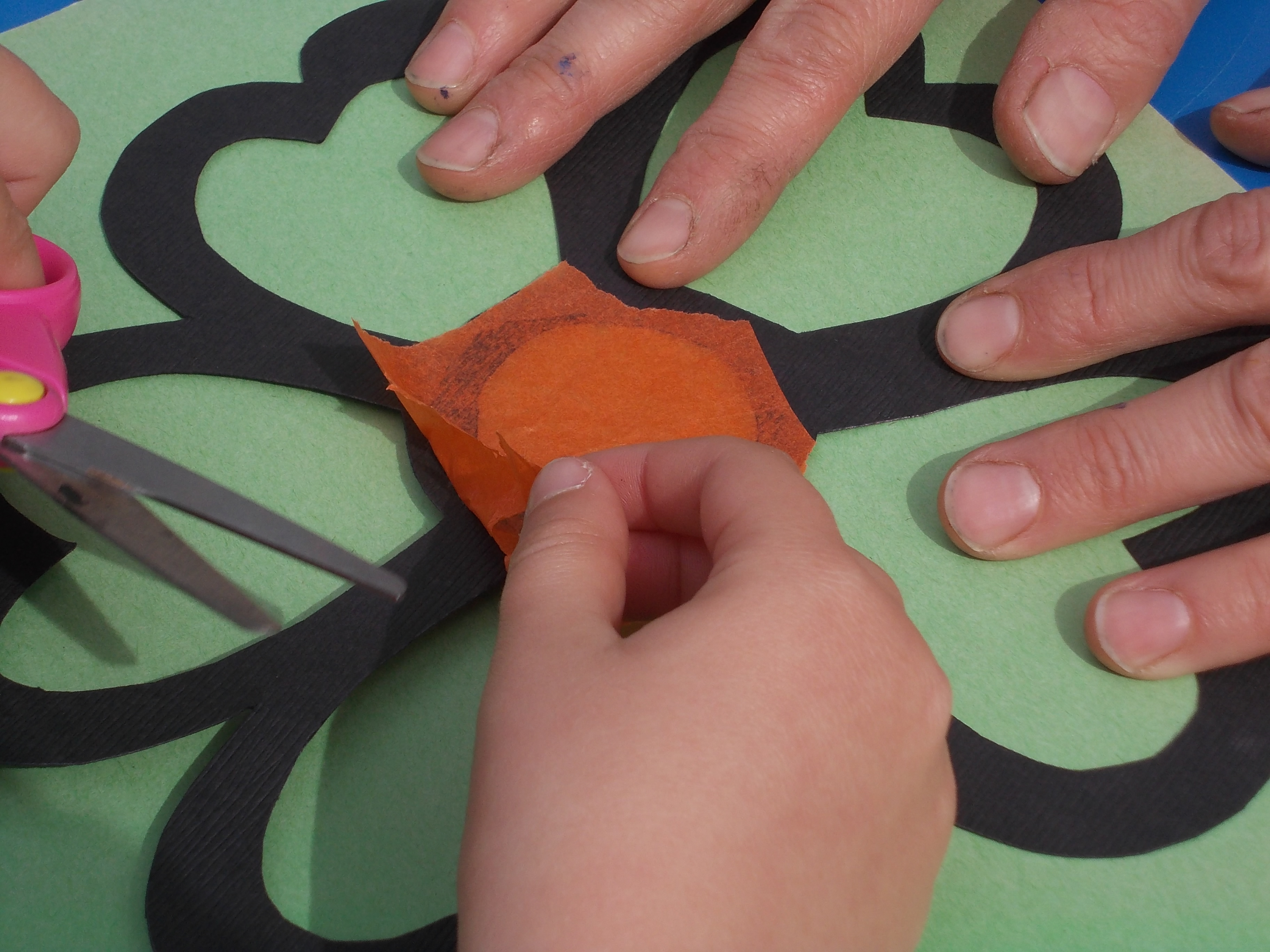
Making a 'stained glass window' flower

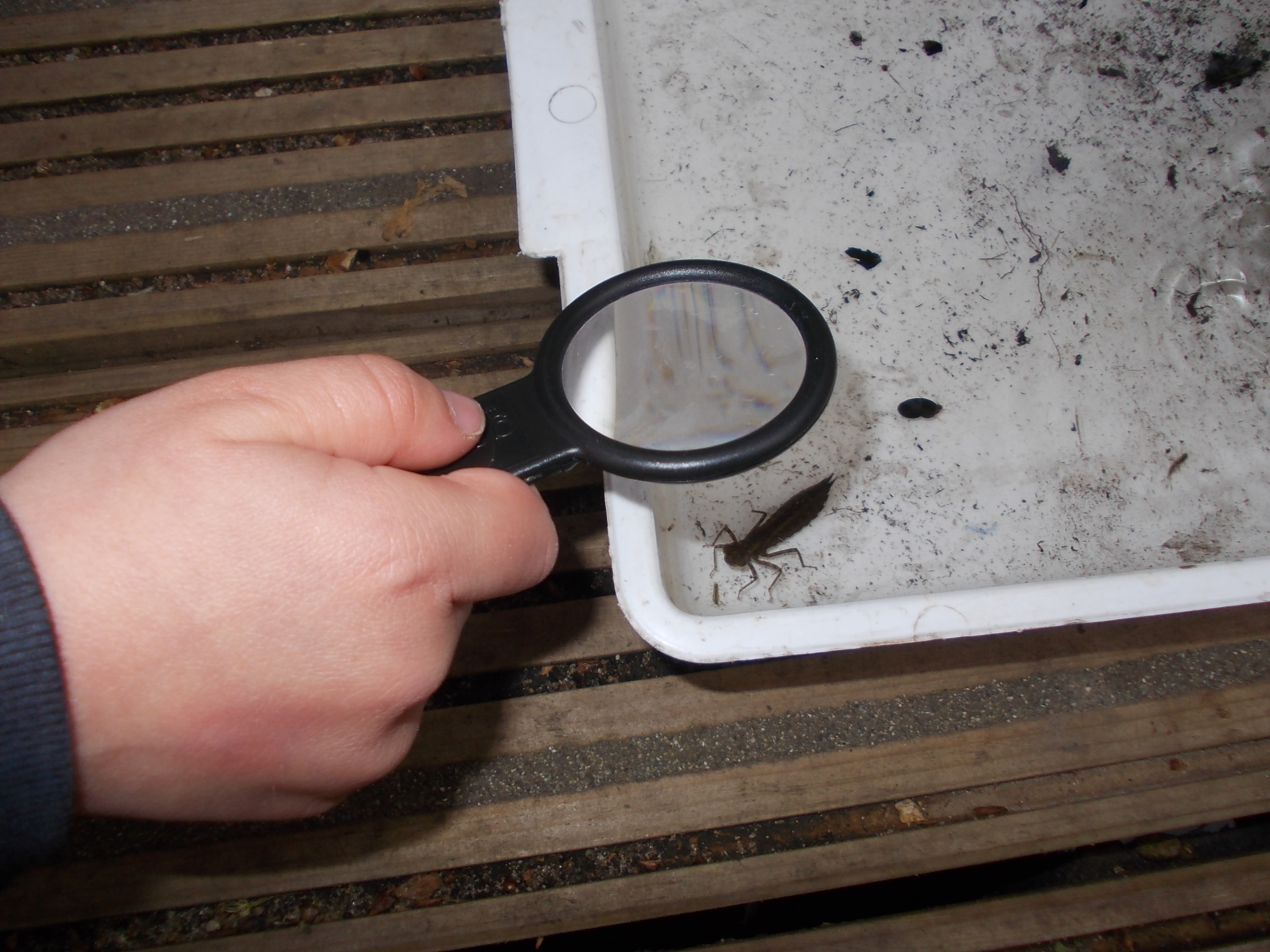
Looking at a dragonfly nymph on Frog Day

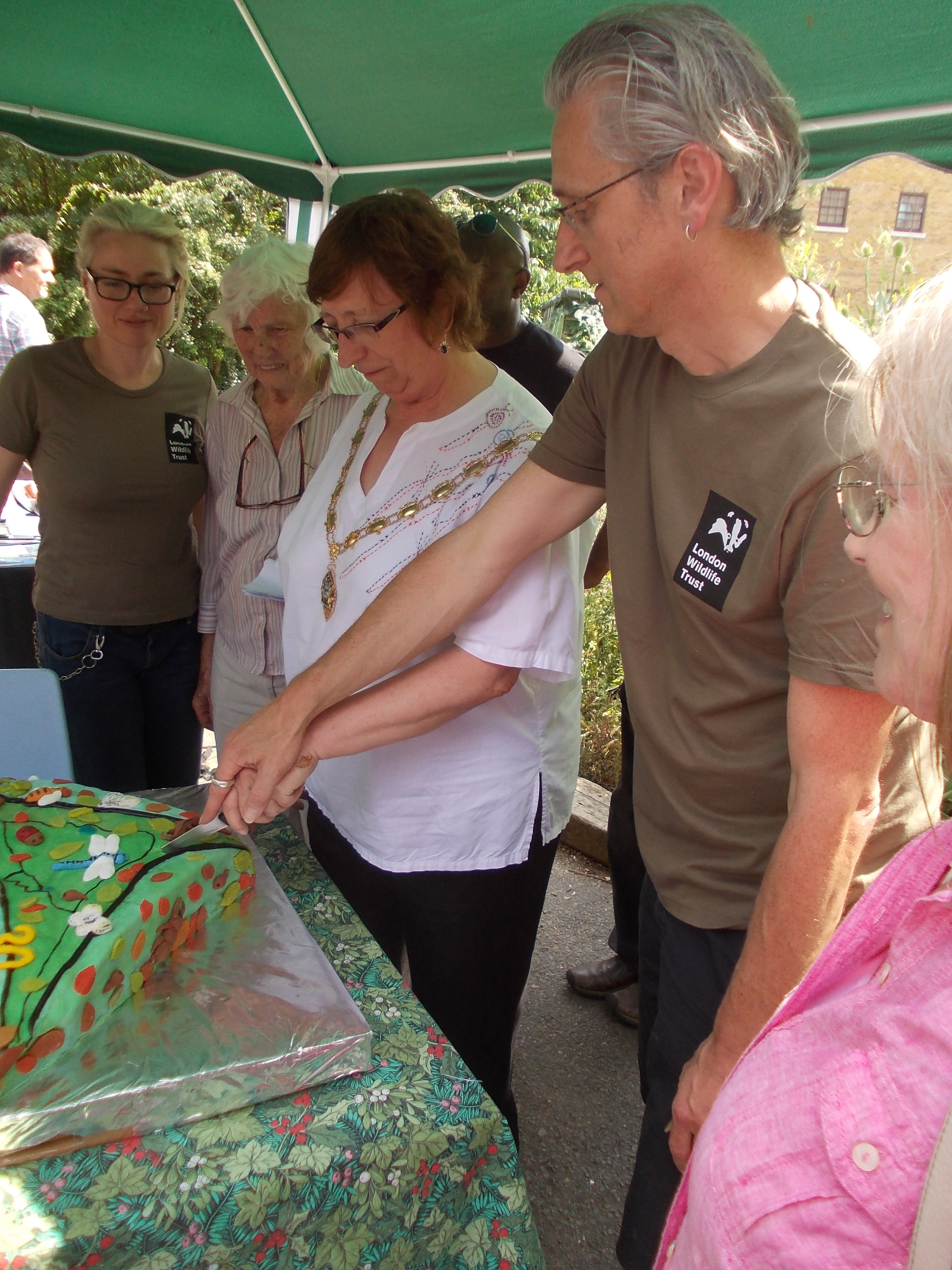
Cutting the cake to celebrate 30 years since site was saved

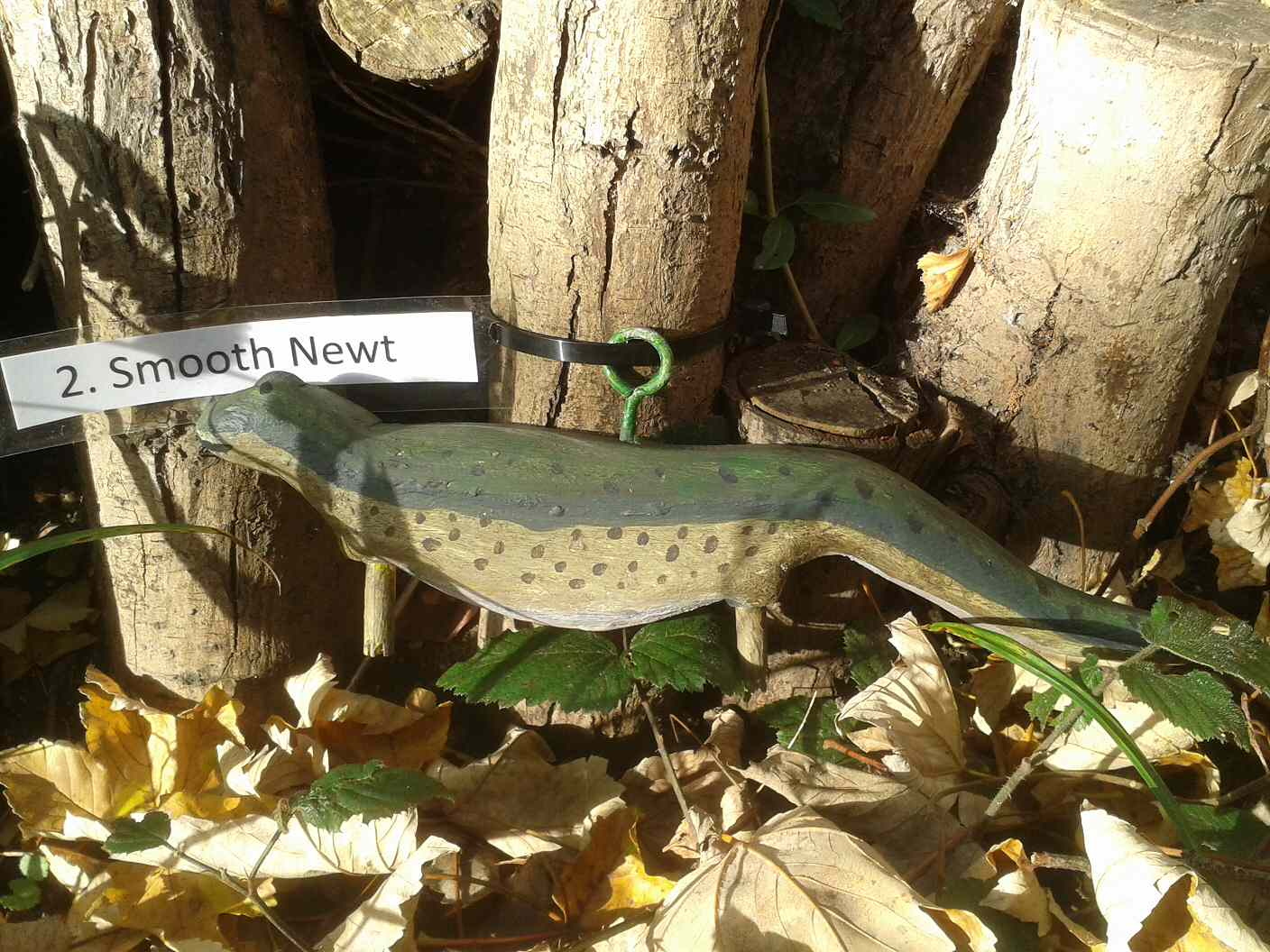
Smooth newt, one of a series of painted wooden animals on a children's nature trail

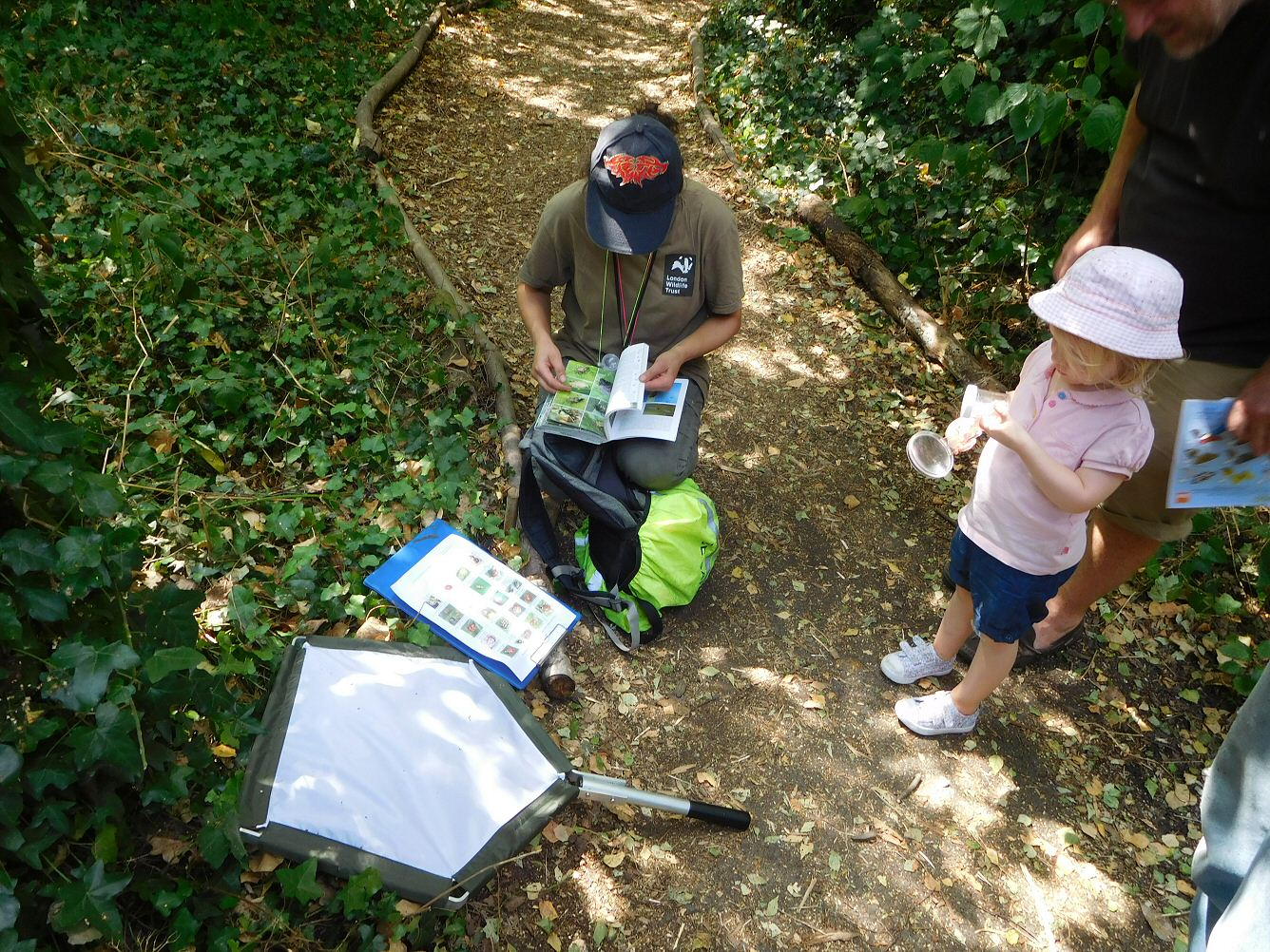
A young entomologist at work on Bugs Day

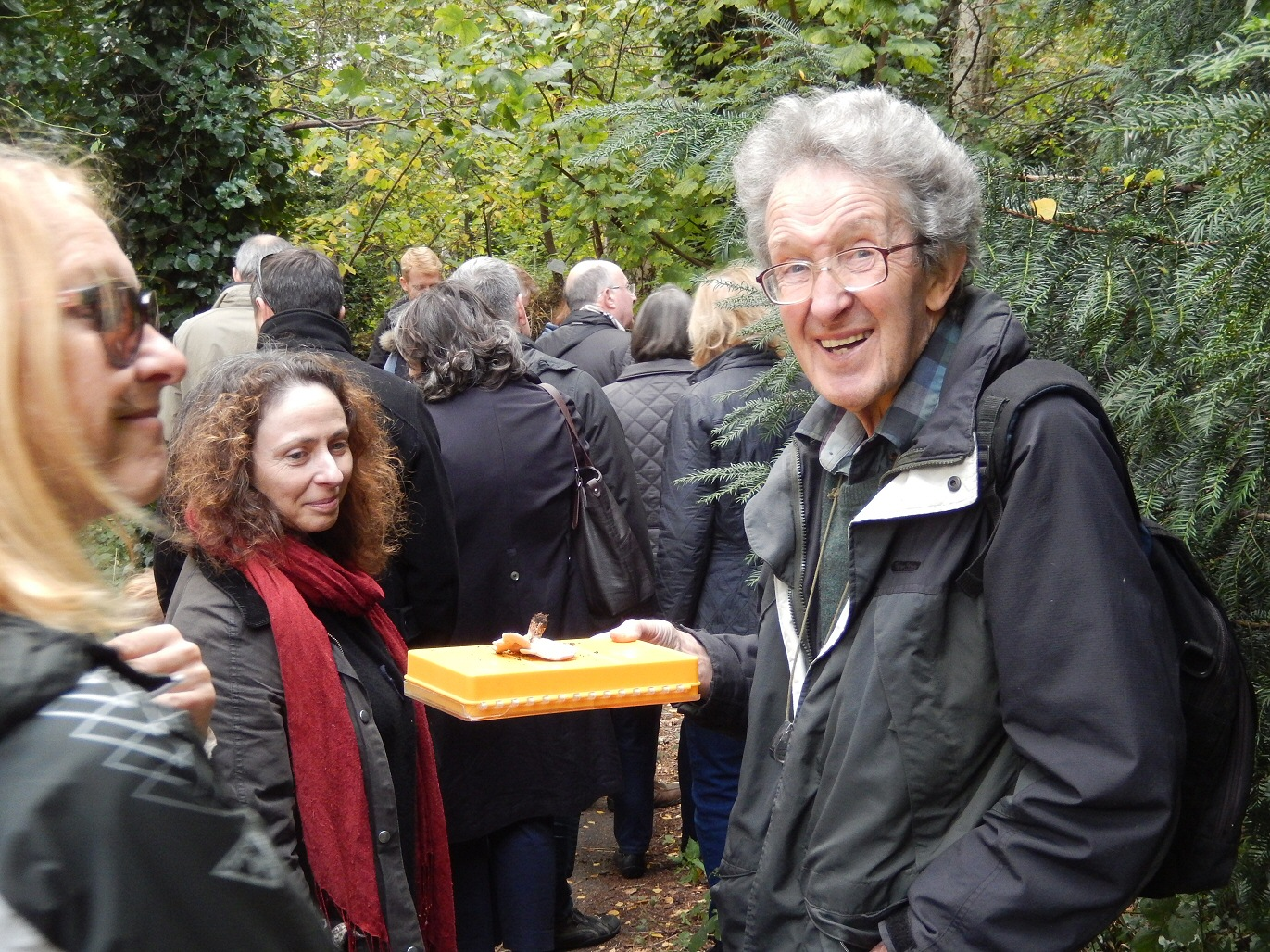
Mycologist Alick Henrici leading a Fungus Foray

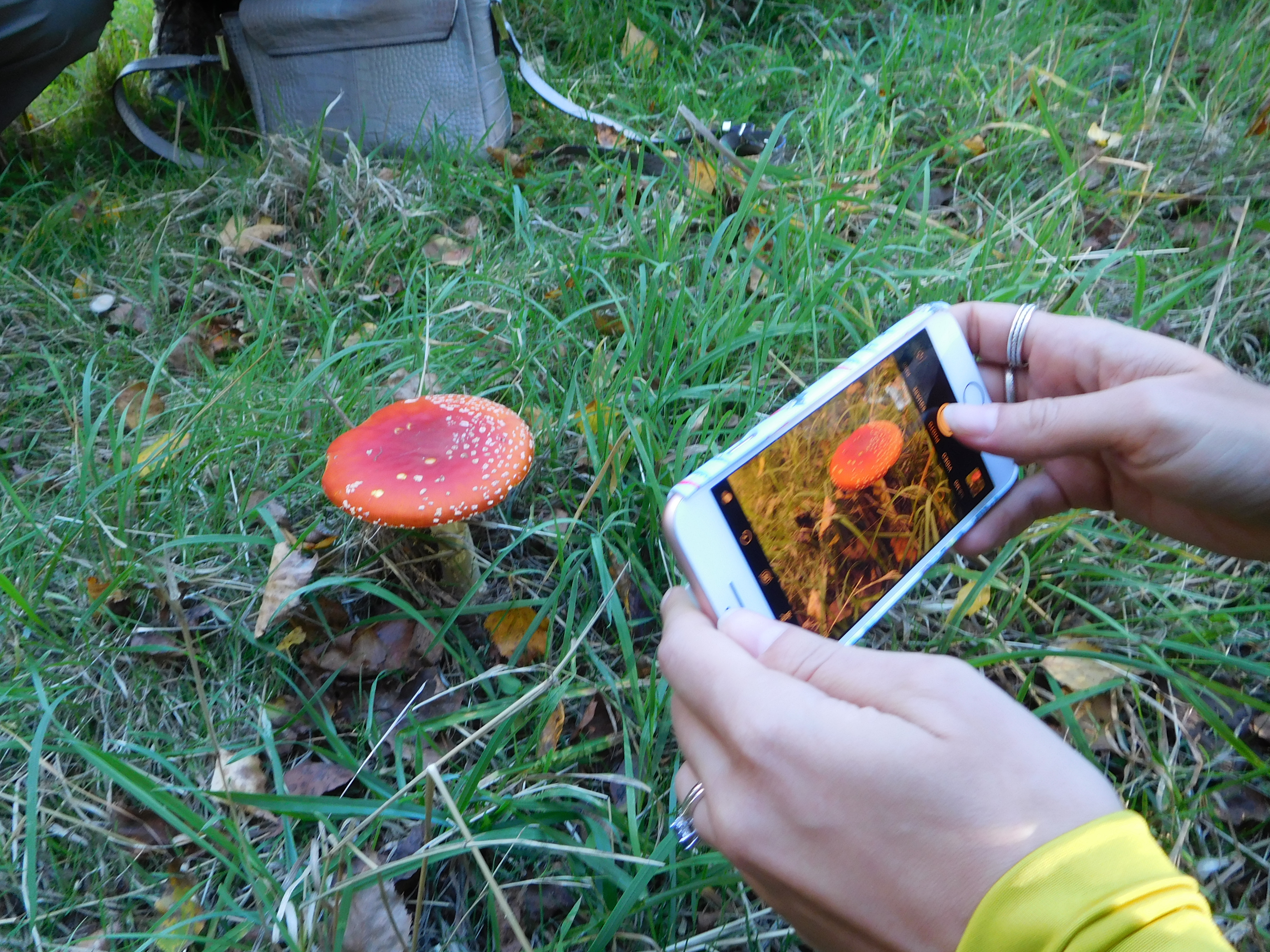
Photographing a fly agaric on a Fungus Foray

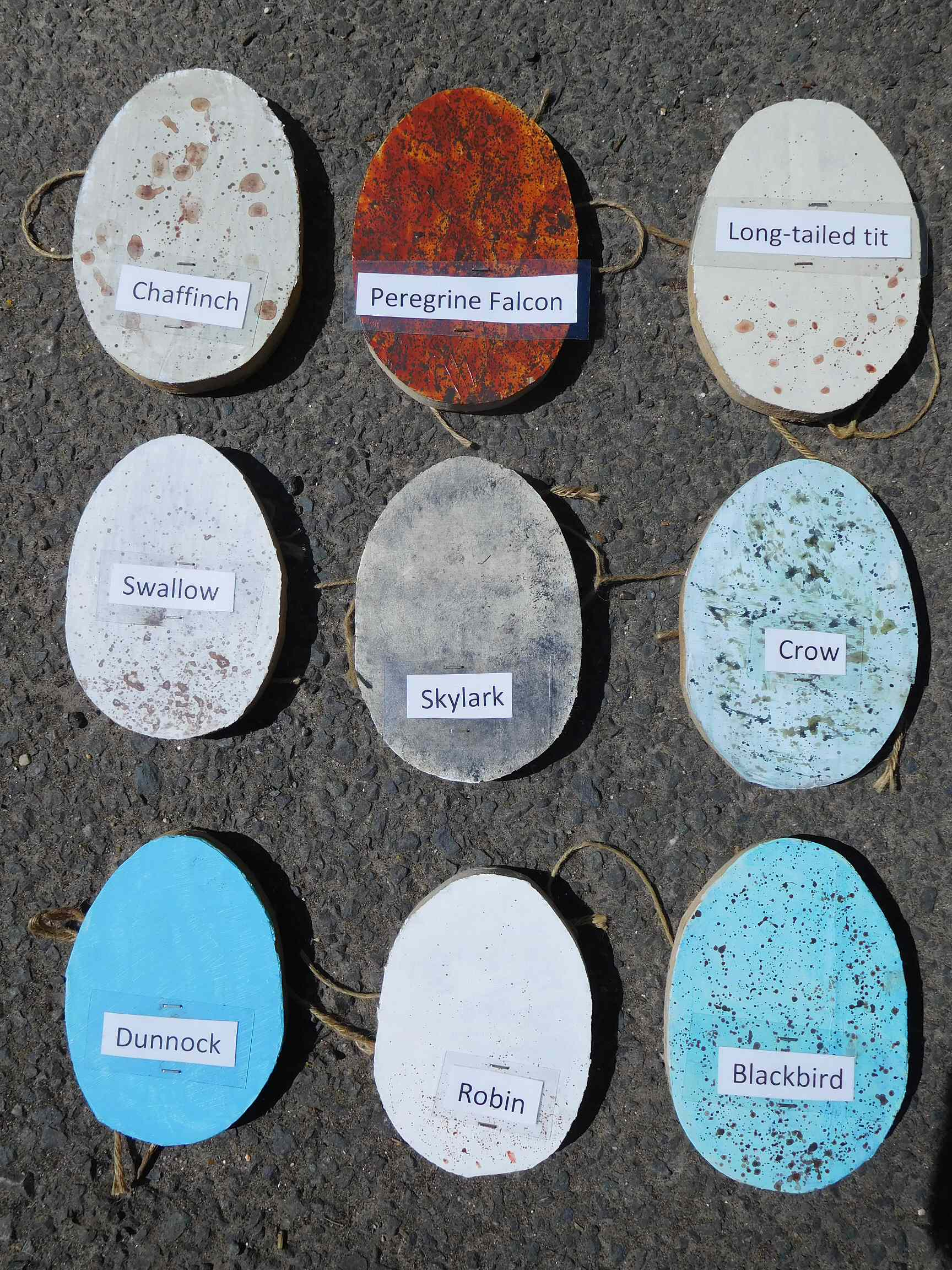
Painted wooden birds' eggs for an Easter nature trail

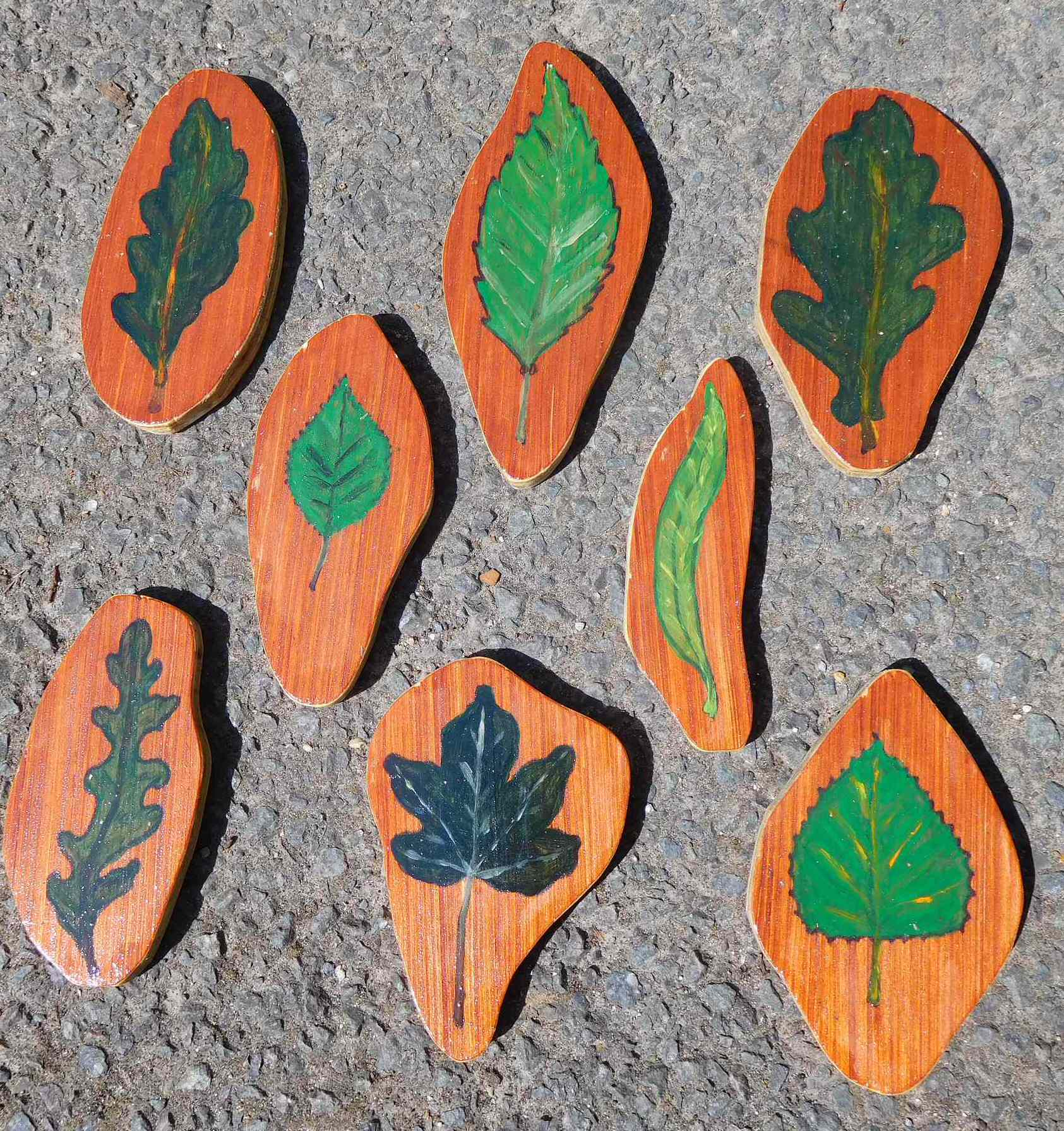
Wooden leaves for a summer nature trail

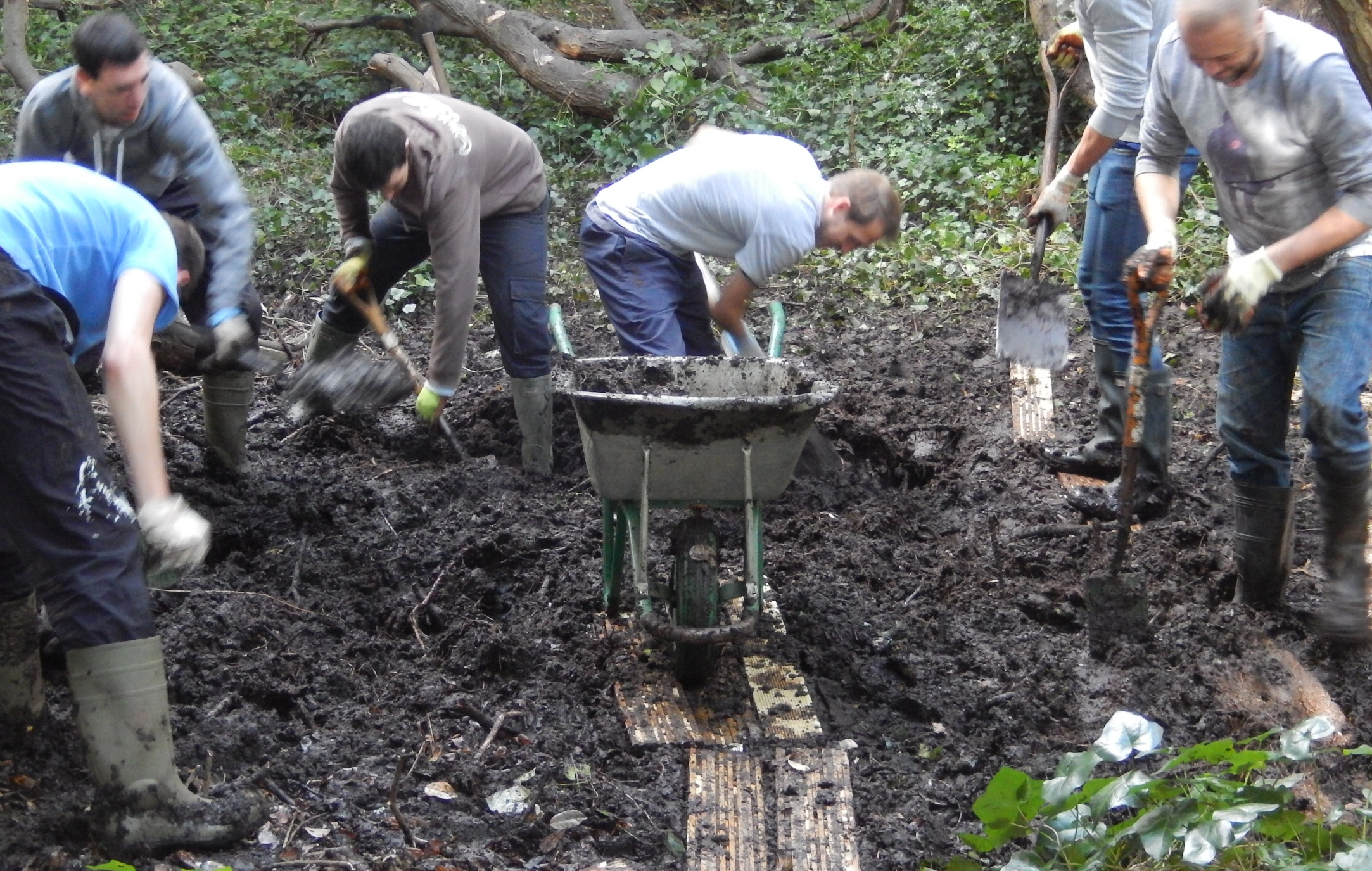
A corporate group digging out wet woodland (willow carr)

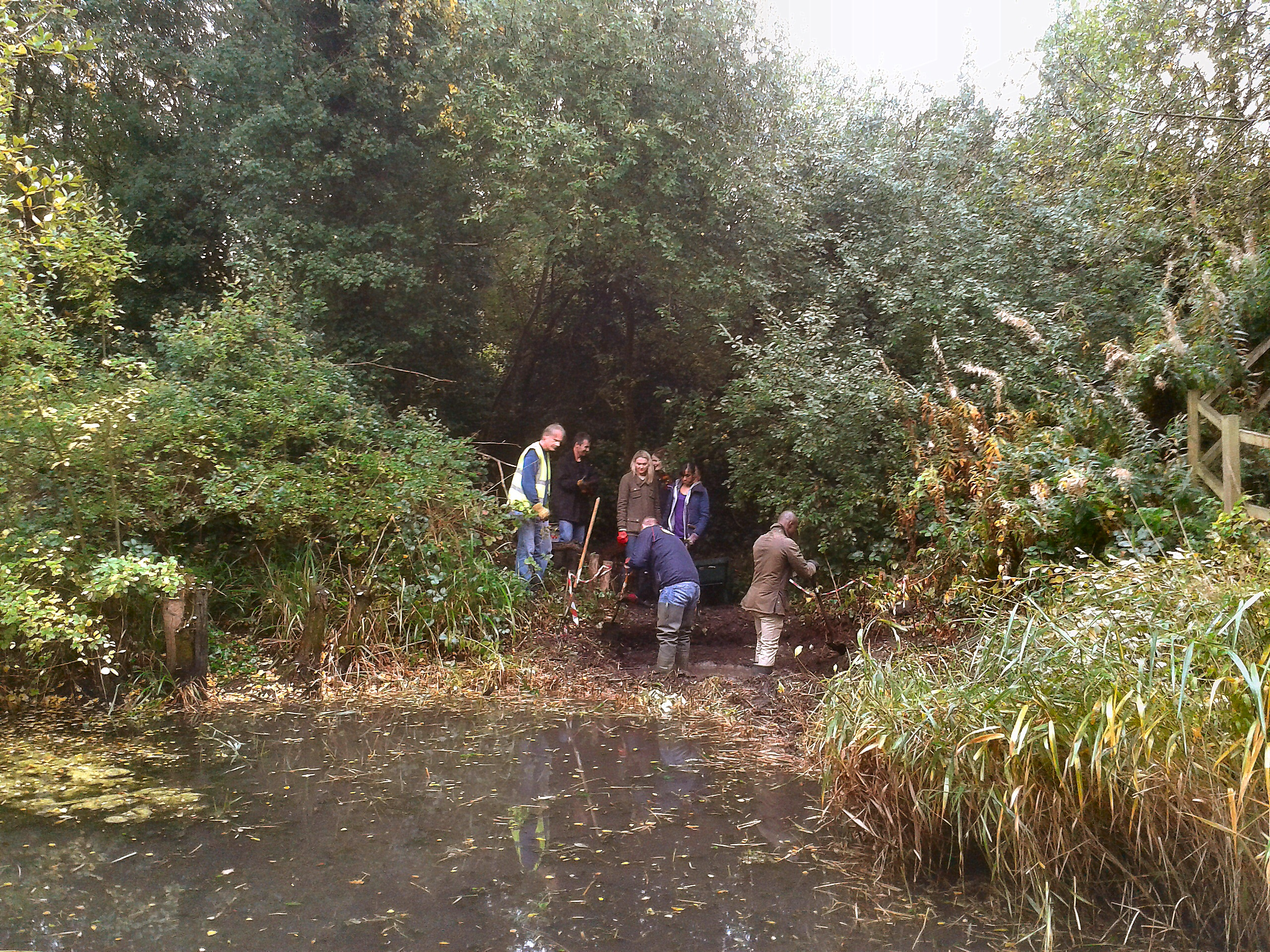
Corporate involvement: a group from Mace digging an extension to the main pond

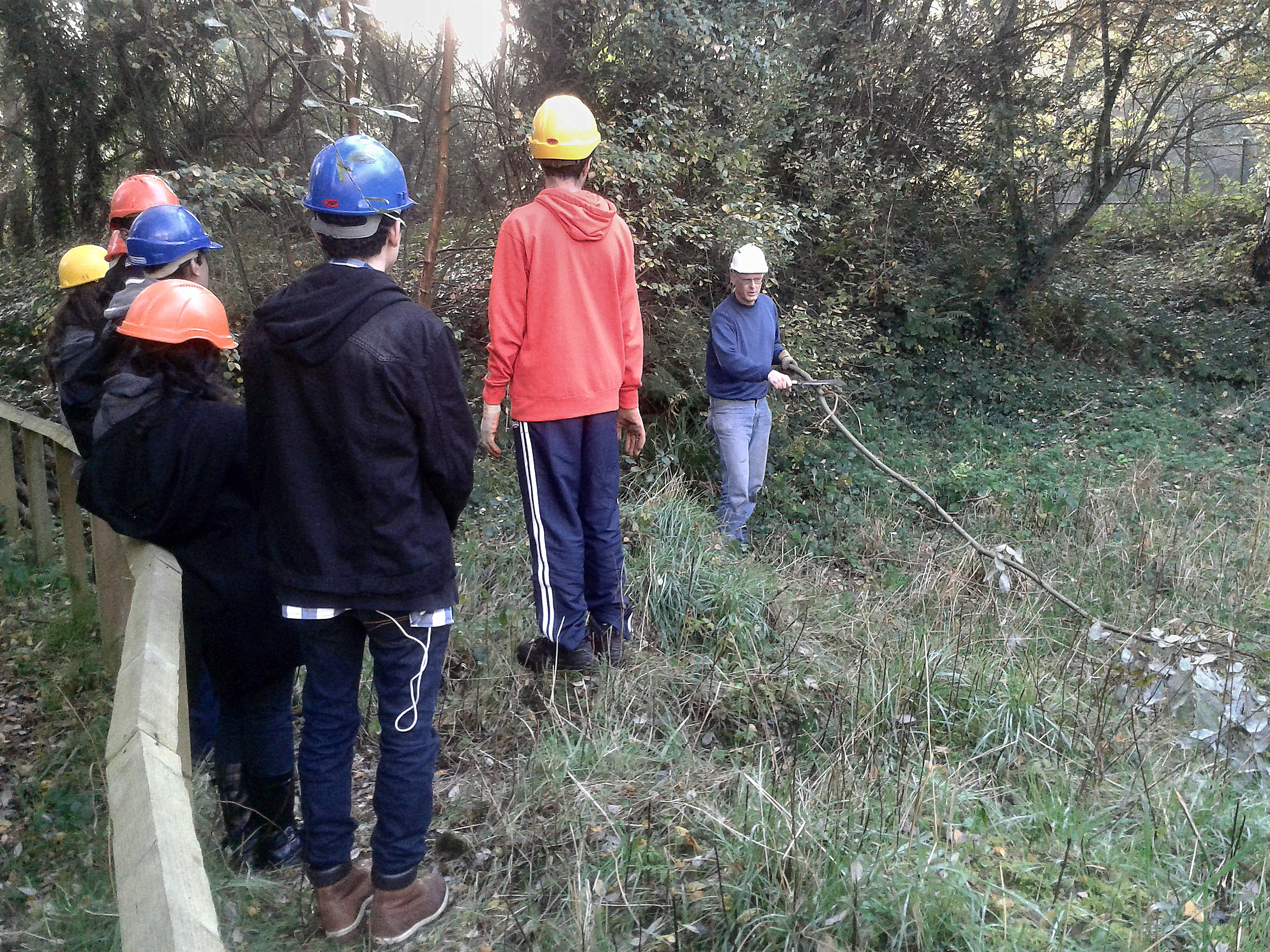
Instructing a Headstart group of young people who intend to make a career in nature conservation

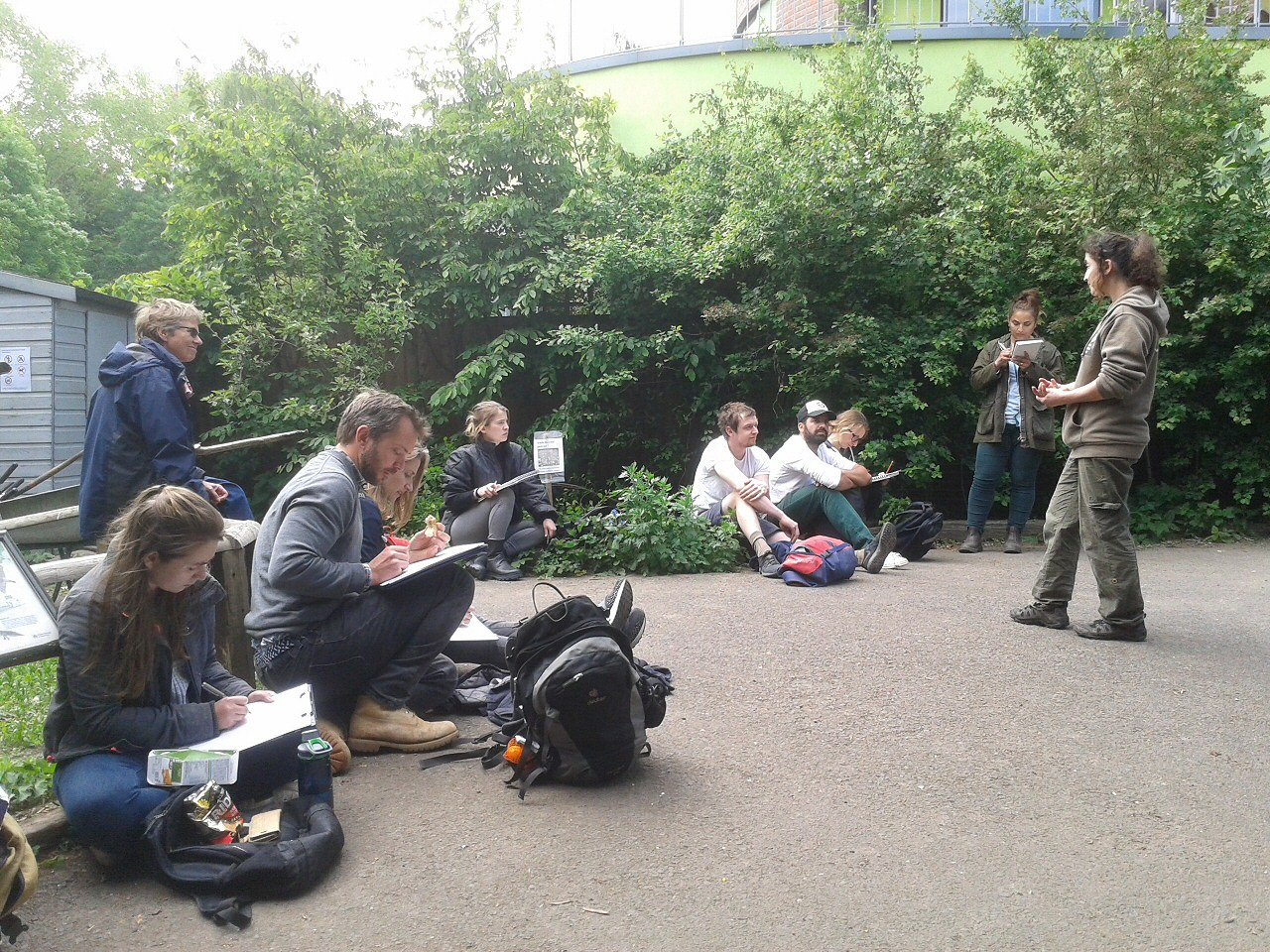
Teaching Landscape Design course students

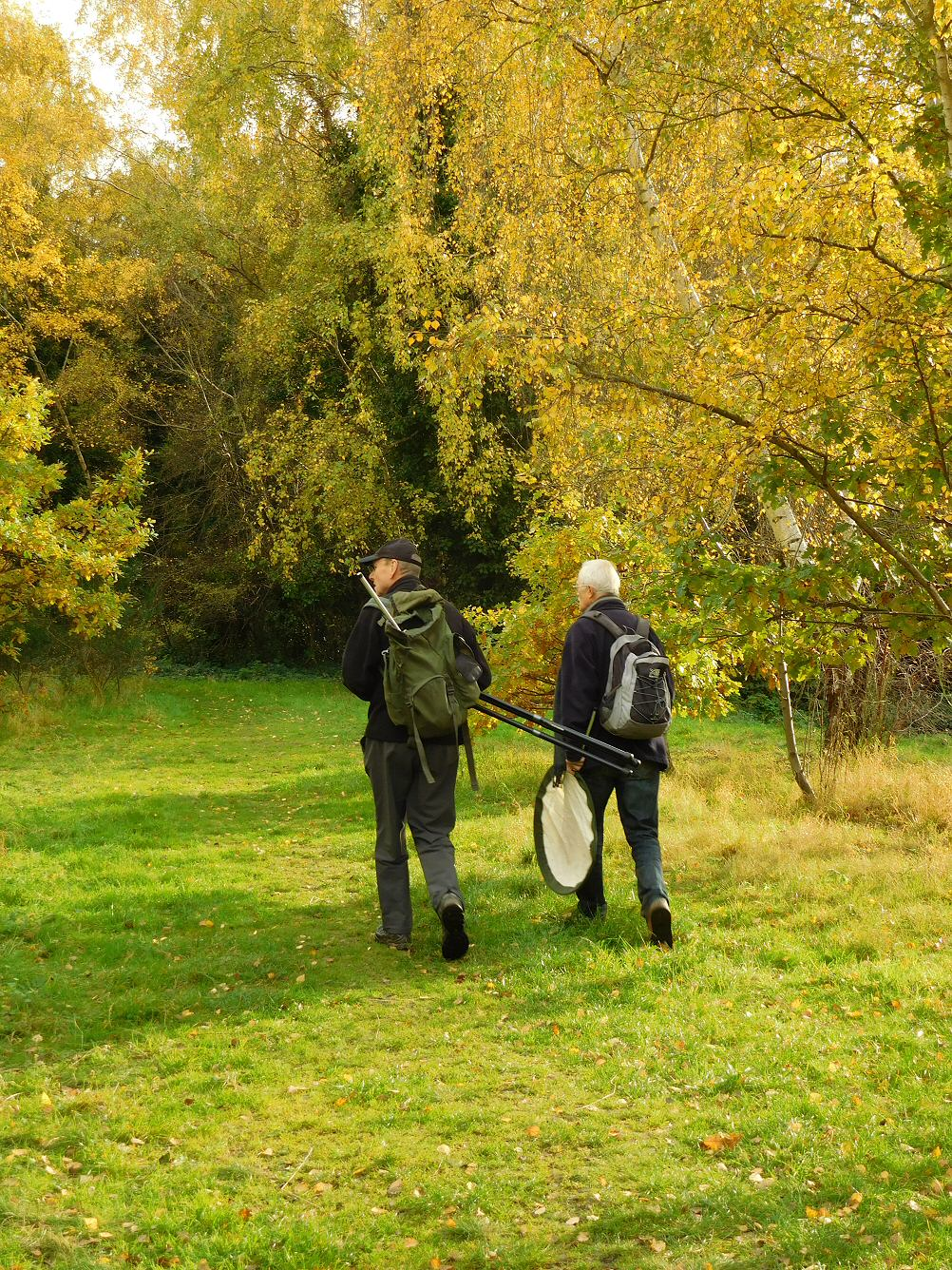
Entomologists on the hunt

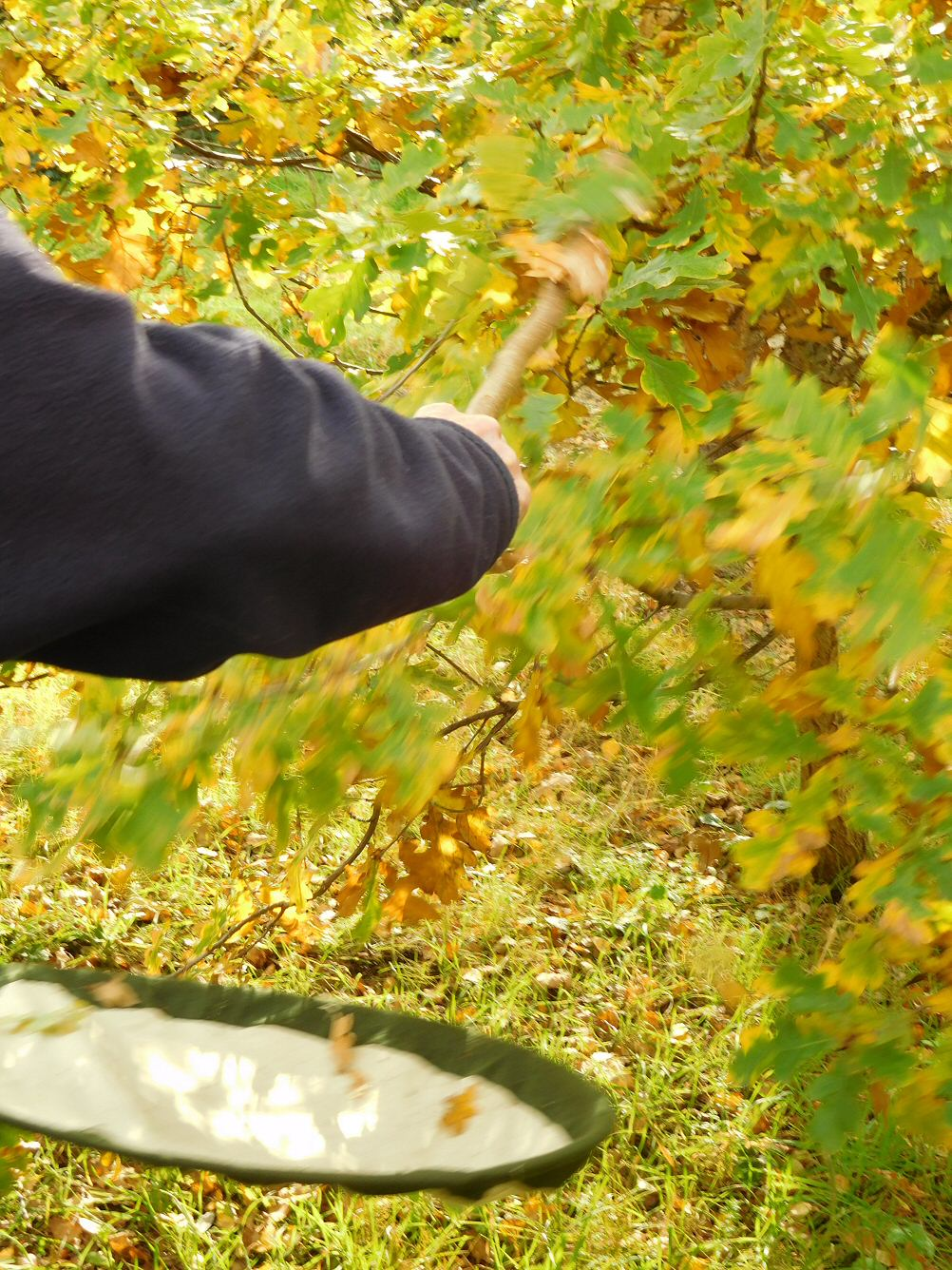
Entomologists beating oak leaves for arthropods

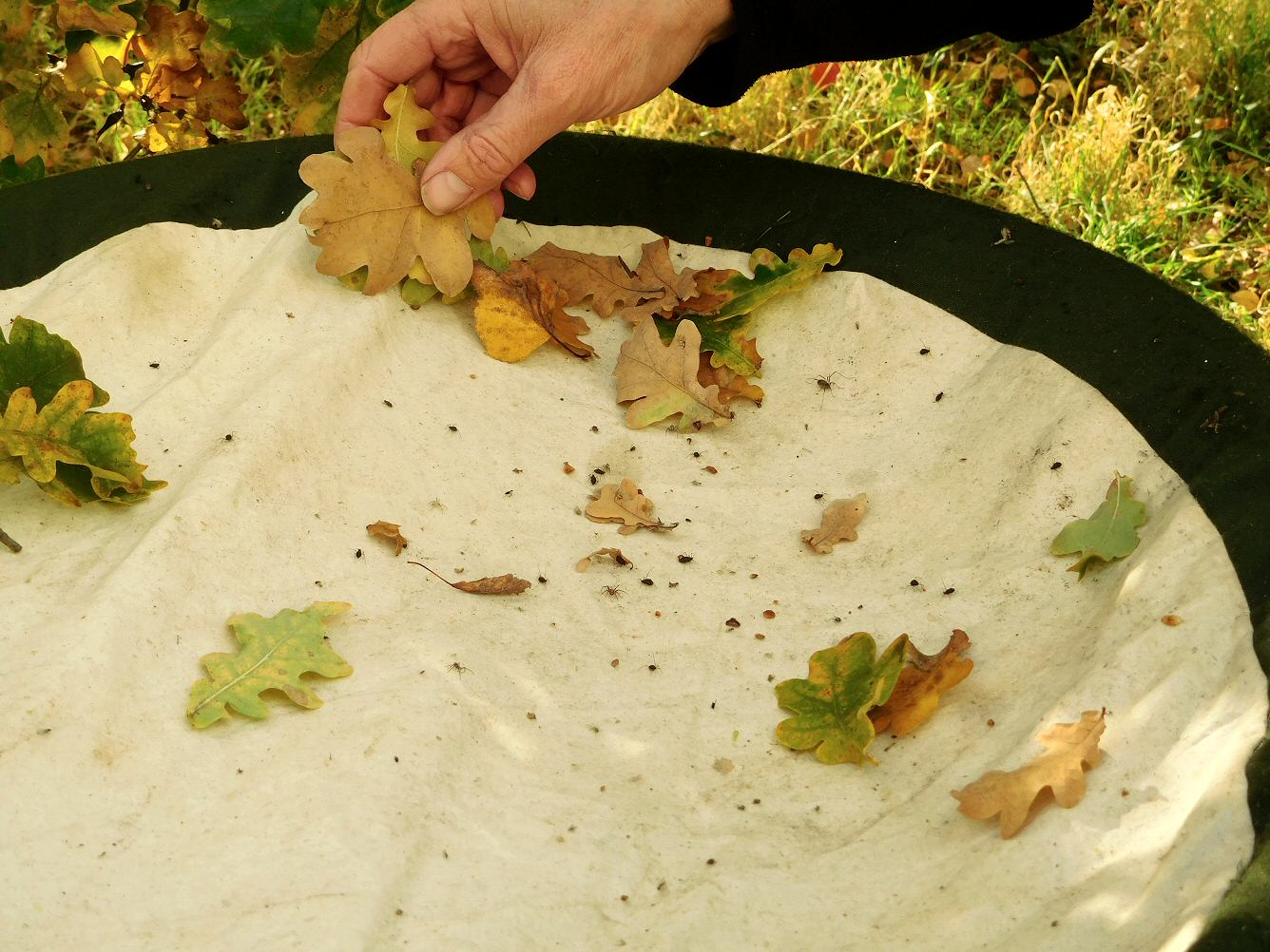
Entomologists examining their catch

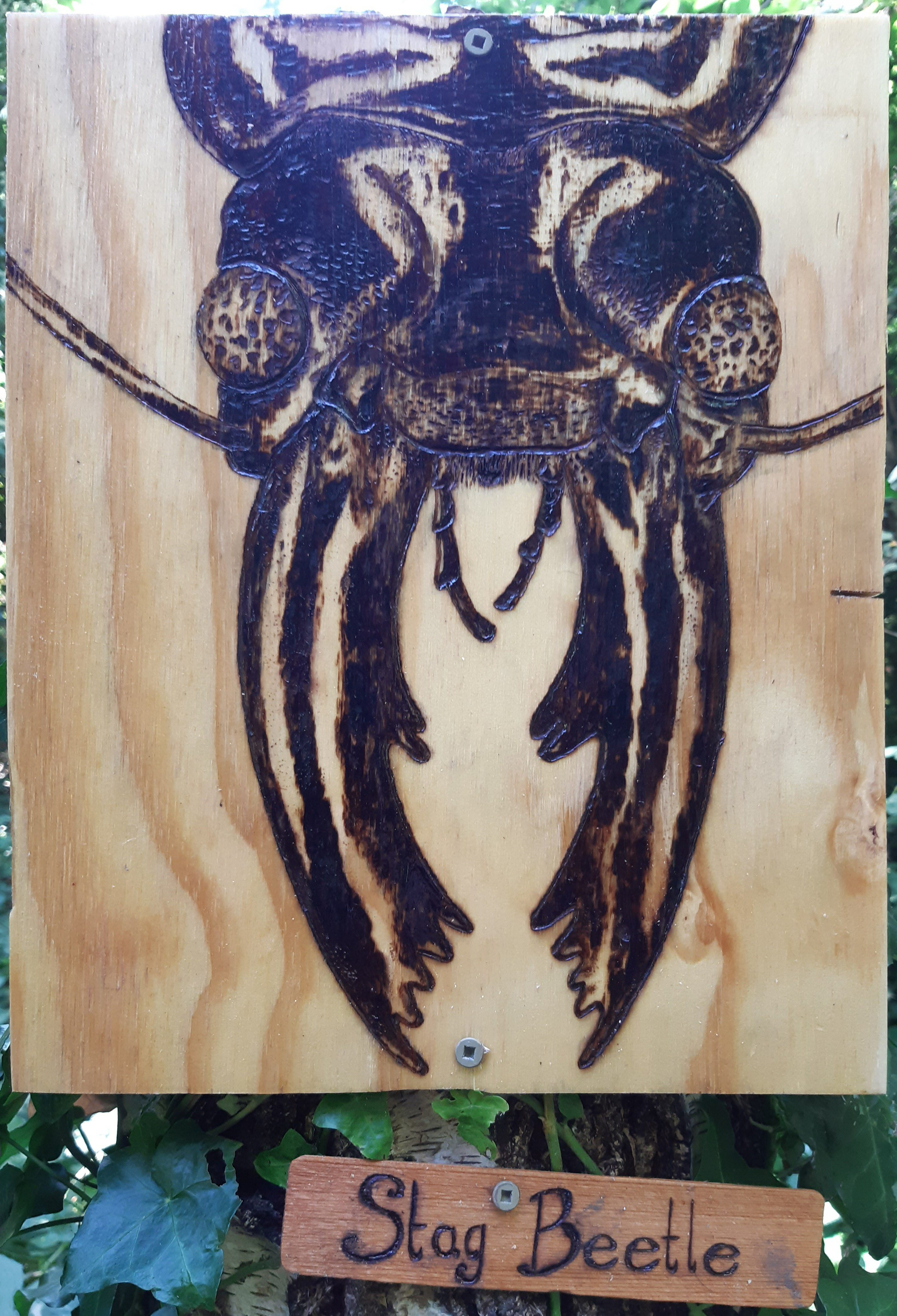
Nature Trail Stag beetle

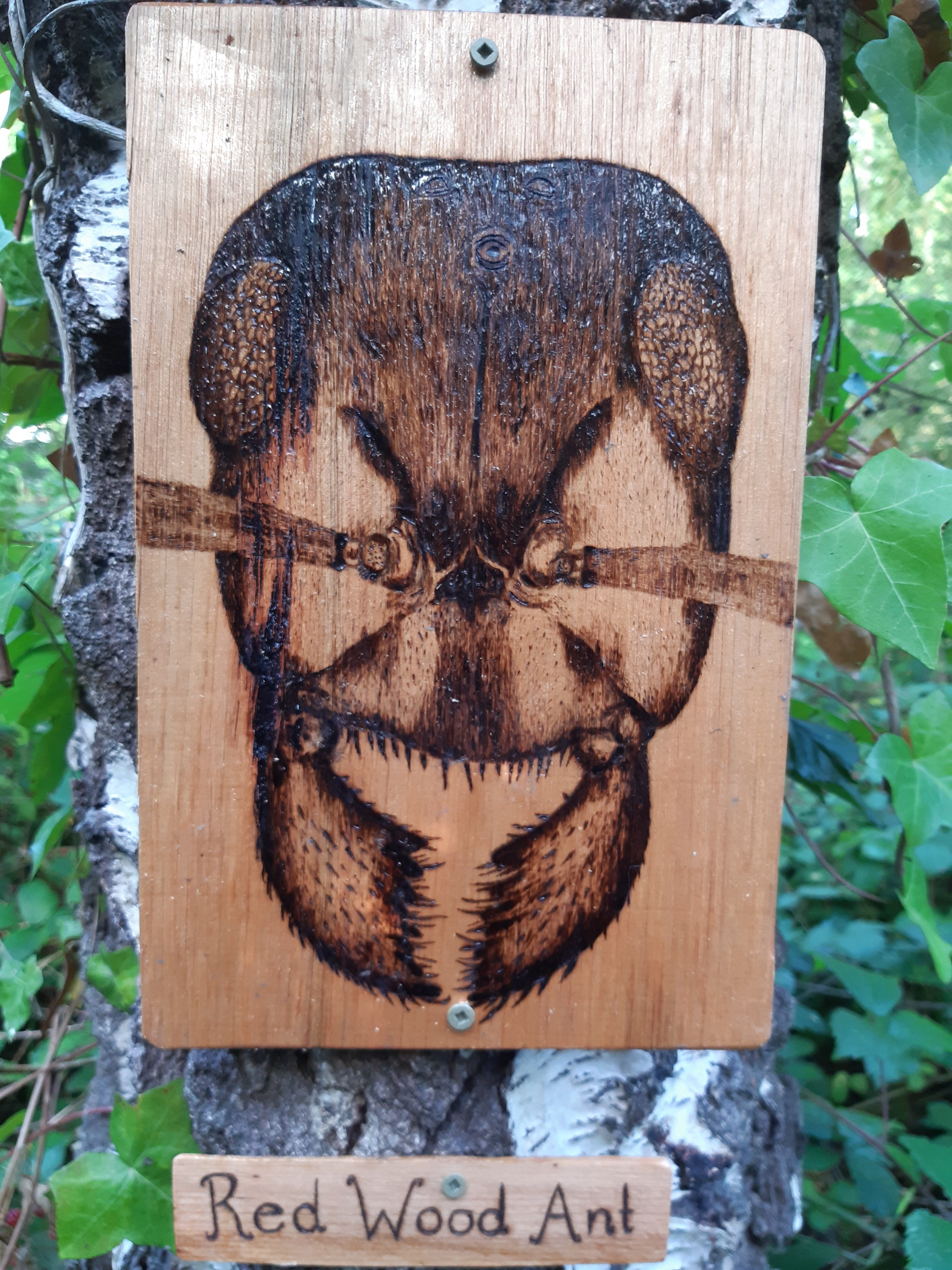
Nature Trail Red Wood Ant

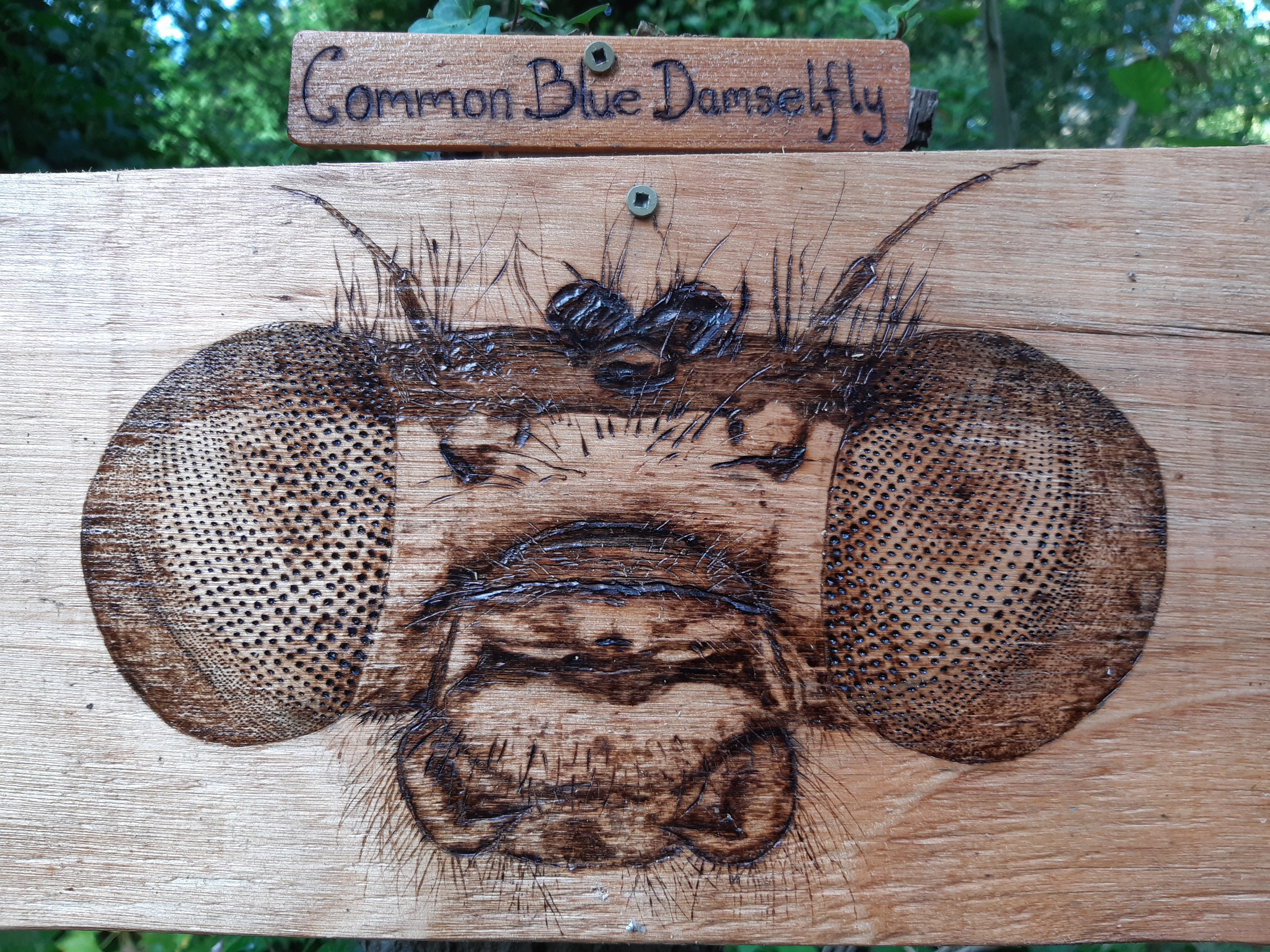
Nature Trail Common Blue Damselfly

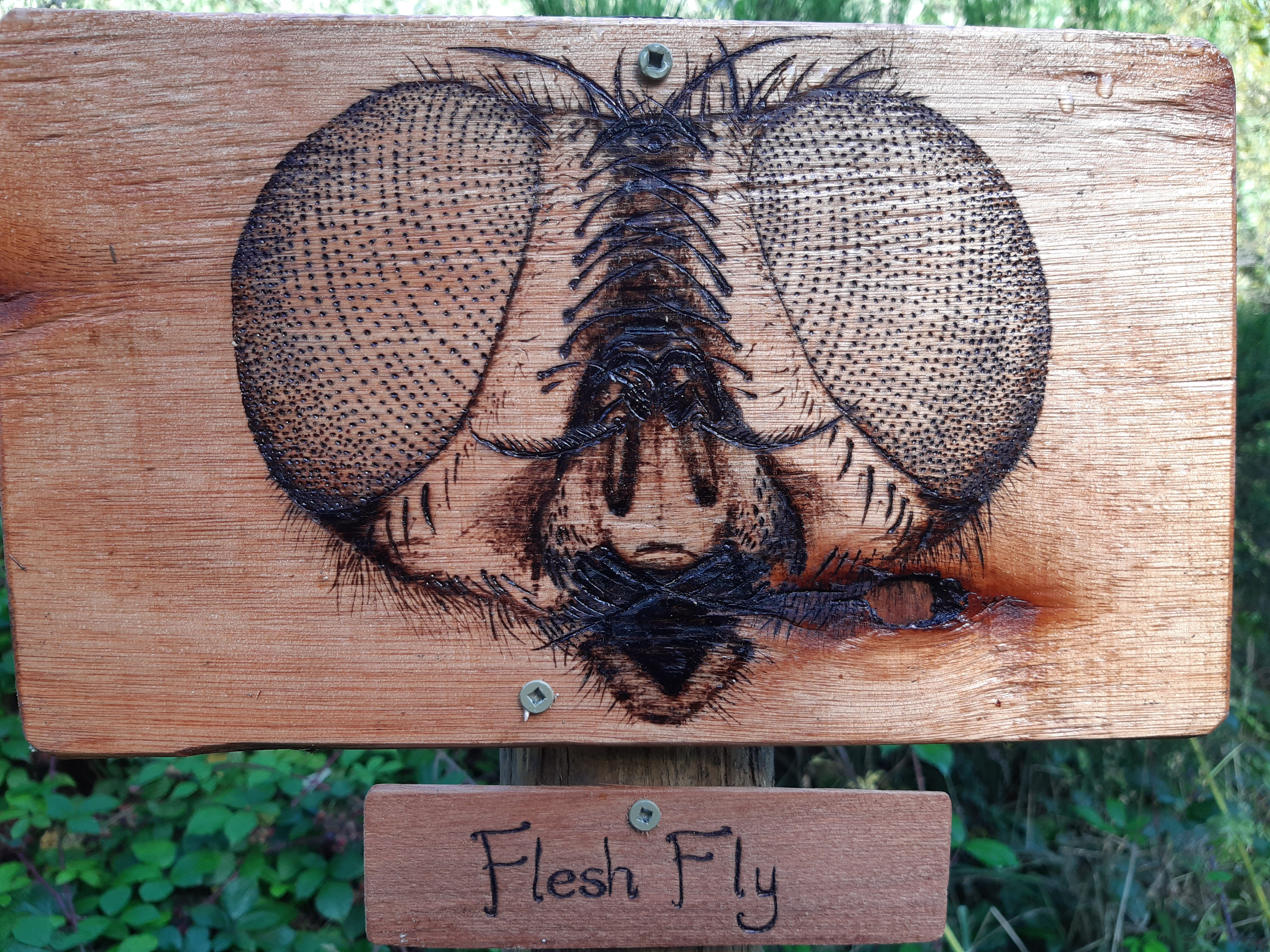
Nature Trail Flesh Fly

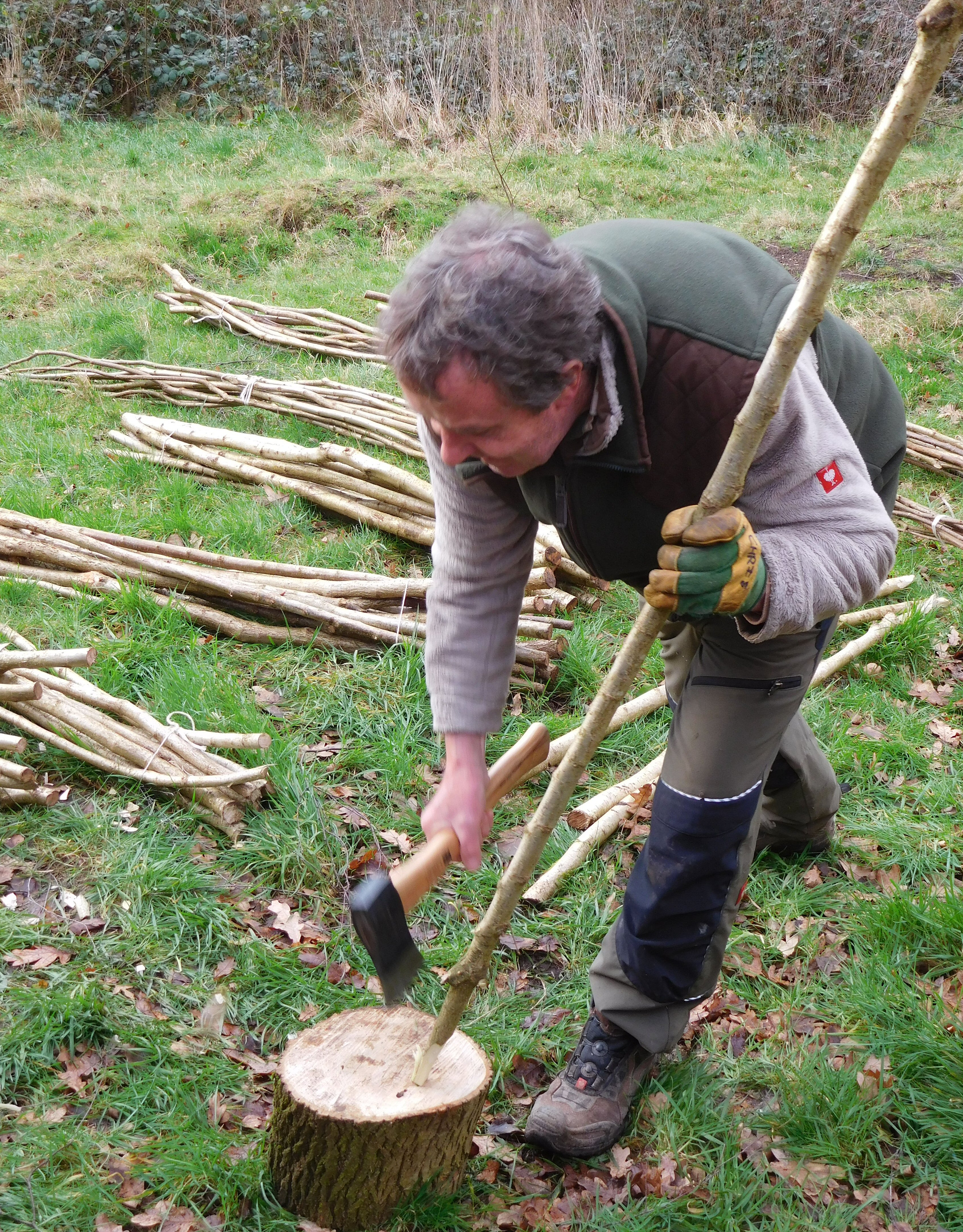
Clive Leeke teaching a hedge laying course

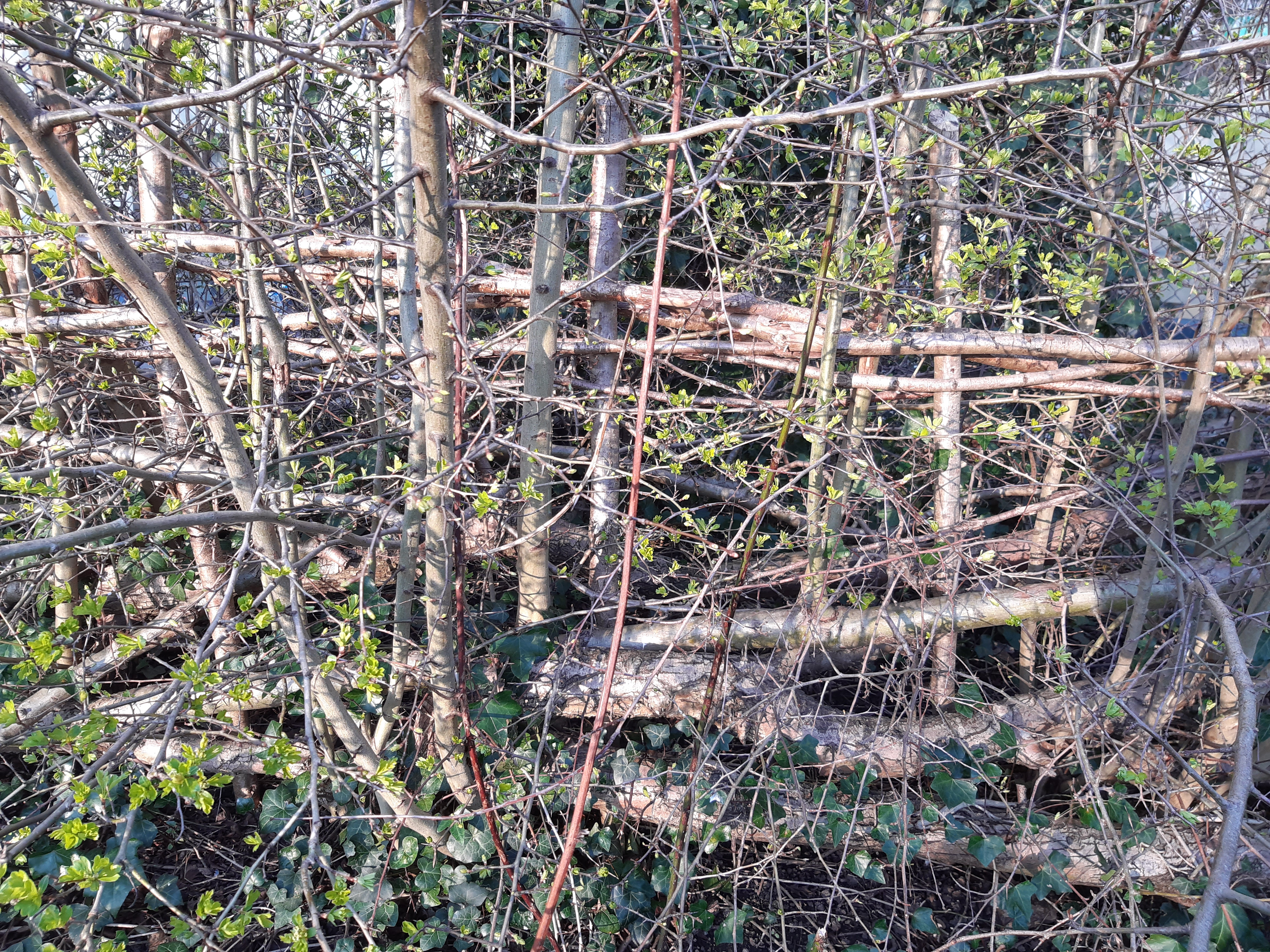
Hedge, 4 years after laying (in and after the training course), a living barrier and habitat

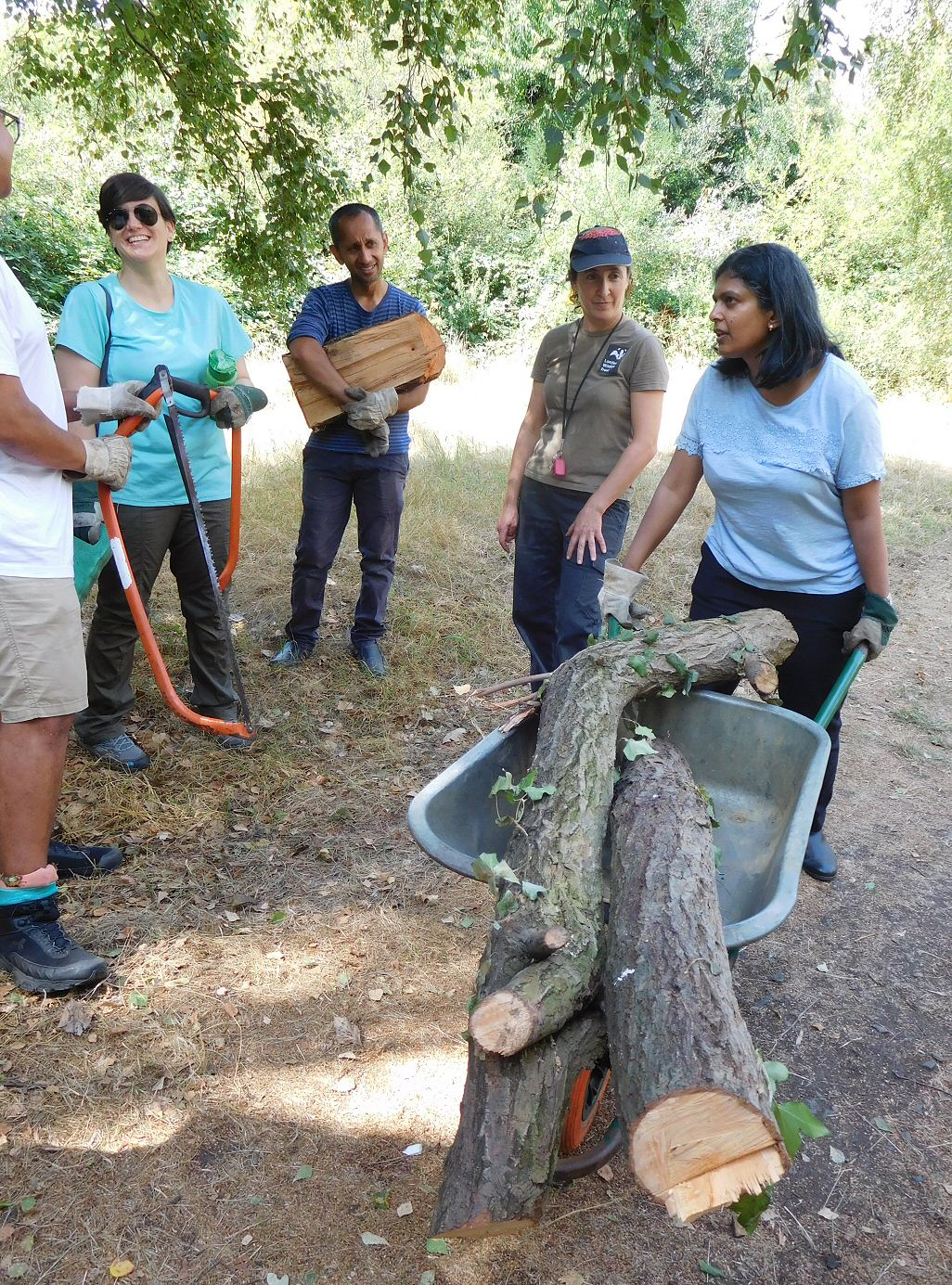
Rupa Huq MP with volunteers and London Wildlife Trust volunteer officer Netty Ribeaux

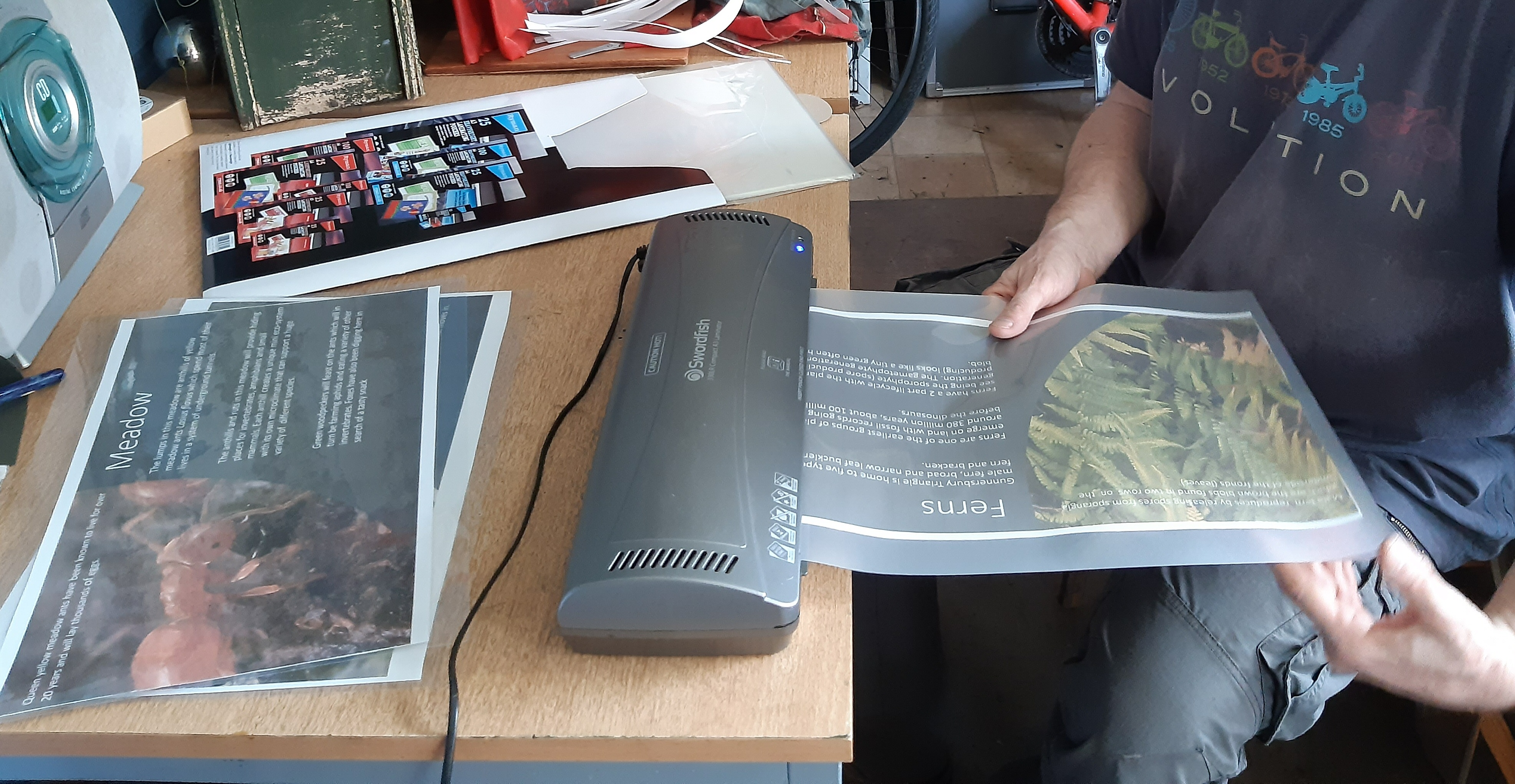
Laminating nature information signs

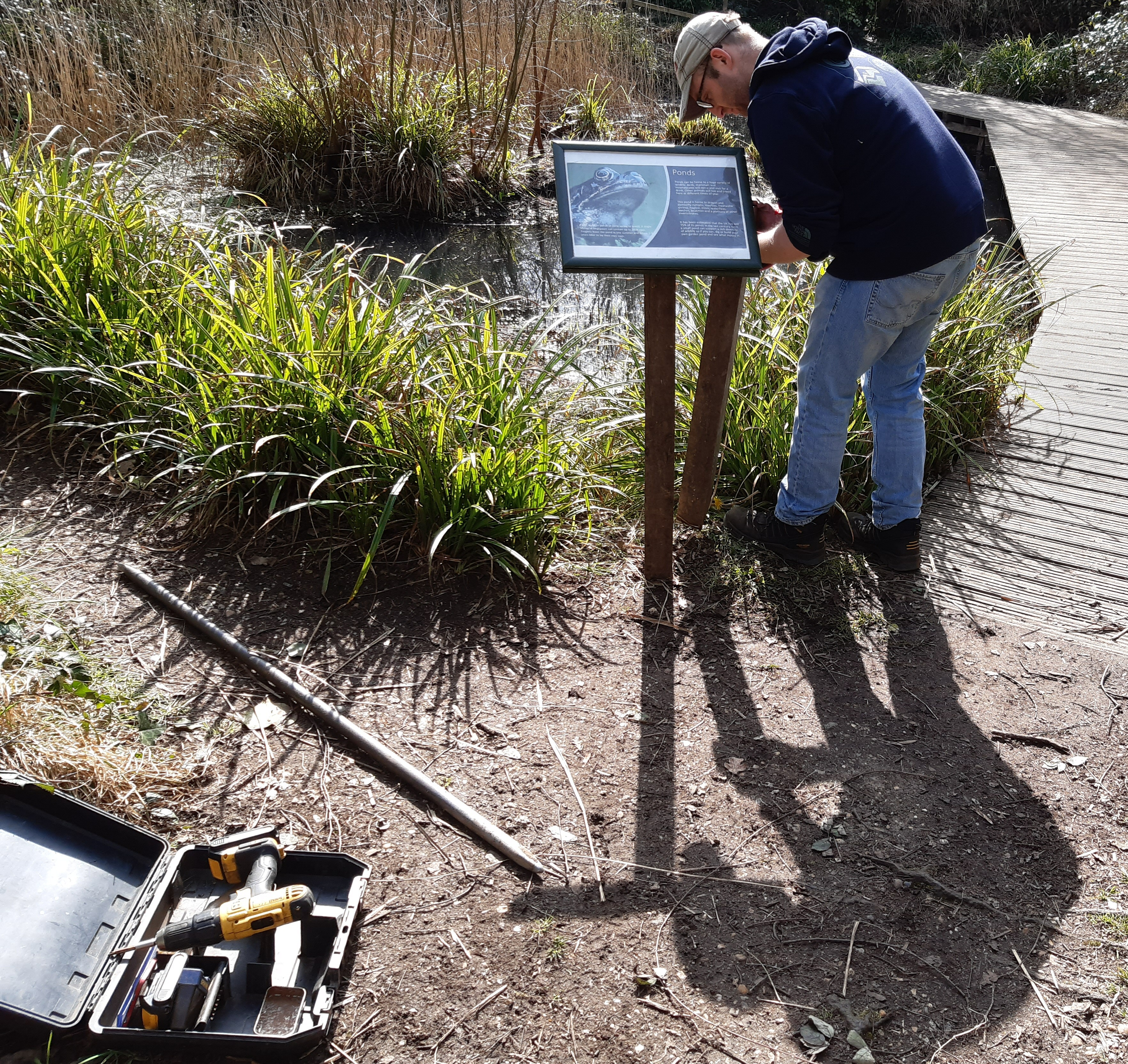
Tamping a new information signpost into place

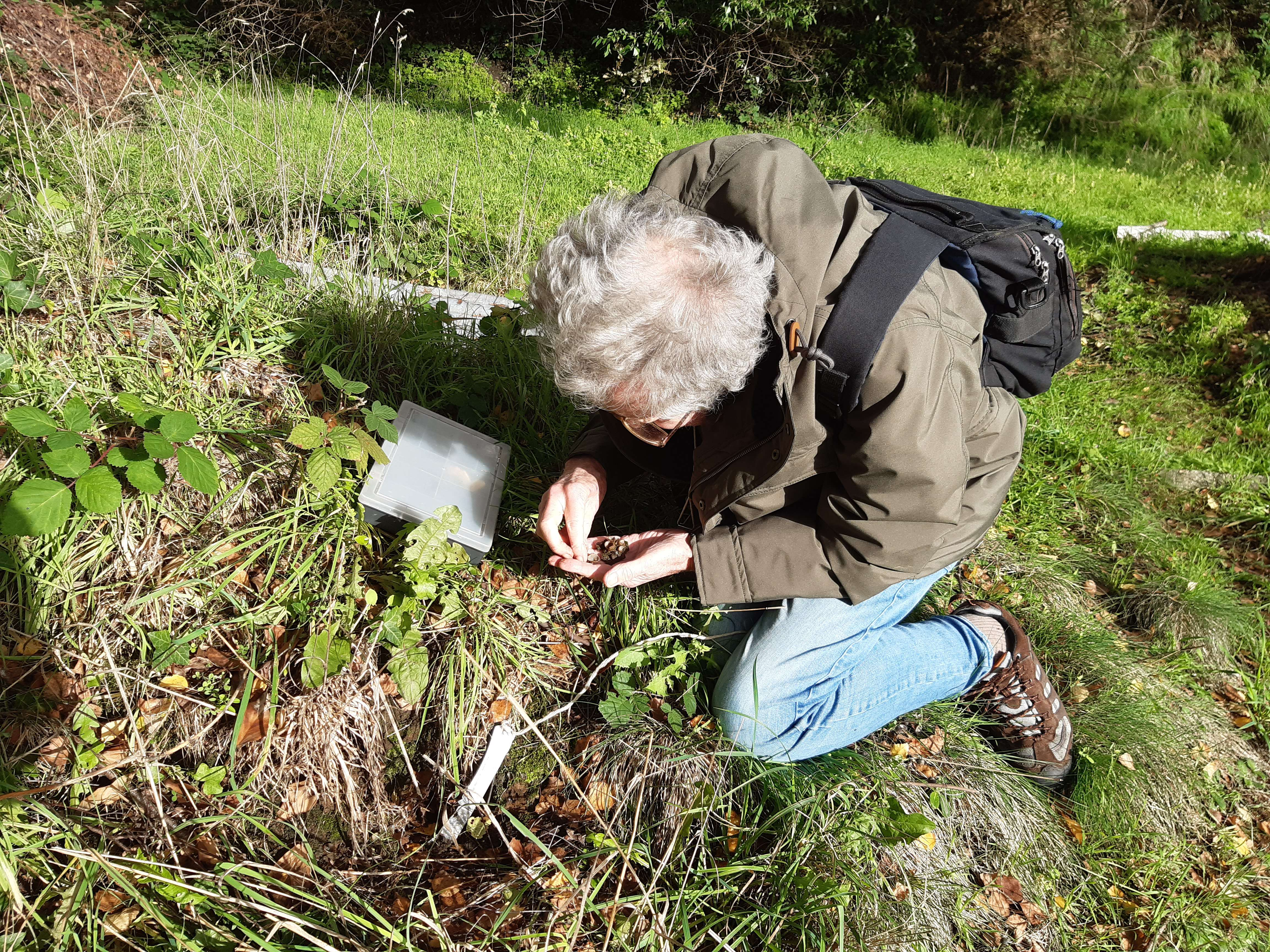
Alick Henrici collecting fungi on a fungus foray

== Sources ==
- Alexander, Ian (2022). "Gunnersbury Triangle". In Burgess, Laura (ed.). West London Wildlife. Supernova Books. pp. 53–57. ISBN 978-1913641306.
- Anon. Gunnersbury Triangle Summary Management Plan 2005–2010. London Wildlife Trust. June 2008.
- Goode, David (2014). Nature in Towns and Cities (Paper ed.). William Collins. pp. 106, 304–308. ISBN 978-0-00724-240-5.
- Goode, David. A Green Renaissance. In: Wild in London. Michael Joseph, London, 1986.
- Sands, Tim (2012). Wildlife in Trust: a hundred years of nature conservation. The Wildlife Trusts. pp. 391–394.
- Wileman, Tony (2014). Gunnersbury Triangle Nature Reserve Management Plan 2014–2019. London Wildlife Trust.
