= Mammals of Rocky Mountain National Park =

List of animals

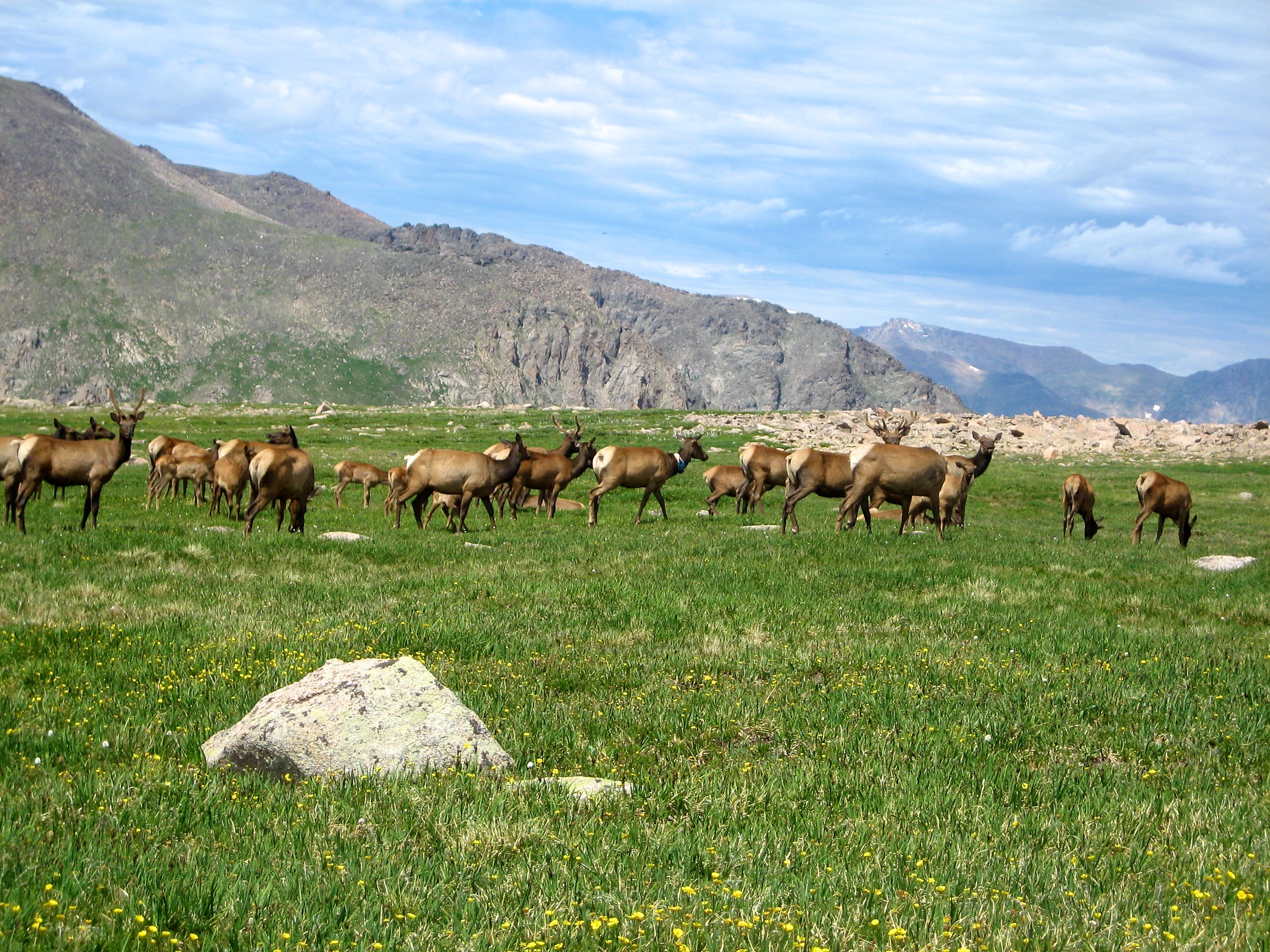
A herd of elk on Flattop Mountain

There are 67 native species of mammals in Rocky Mountain National Park, a 265,461 acres (107,428 ha) park in Colorado. Species are listed by common name, scientific name, habitat, and abundance. Species which are extirpated, or locally extinct, are marked with an EX.

== Pronghorn ==
Order: Artiodactyla Family: Antilocapridae

- Pronghorn, Antilocapra americana, meadows, grasslands, sagebrush, occasional

== Bovids ==
A pair of bighorn sheep

Order: Artiodactyla Family: Bovidae

- American bison, Bos bison, meadows, grasslands, tundra, extirpated EX
- Aurochs, Bos taurus, meadows, Ex, E
- Mountain goat, Oreamnos americanus, cliffs, rocky areas, occasional (non-native)
- Bighorn sheep, Ovis canadensis, cliffs, rocky areas, tundra, common

== Moose, elk, and deer ==
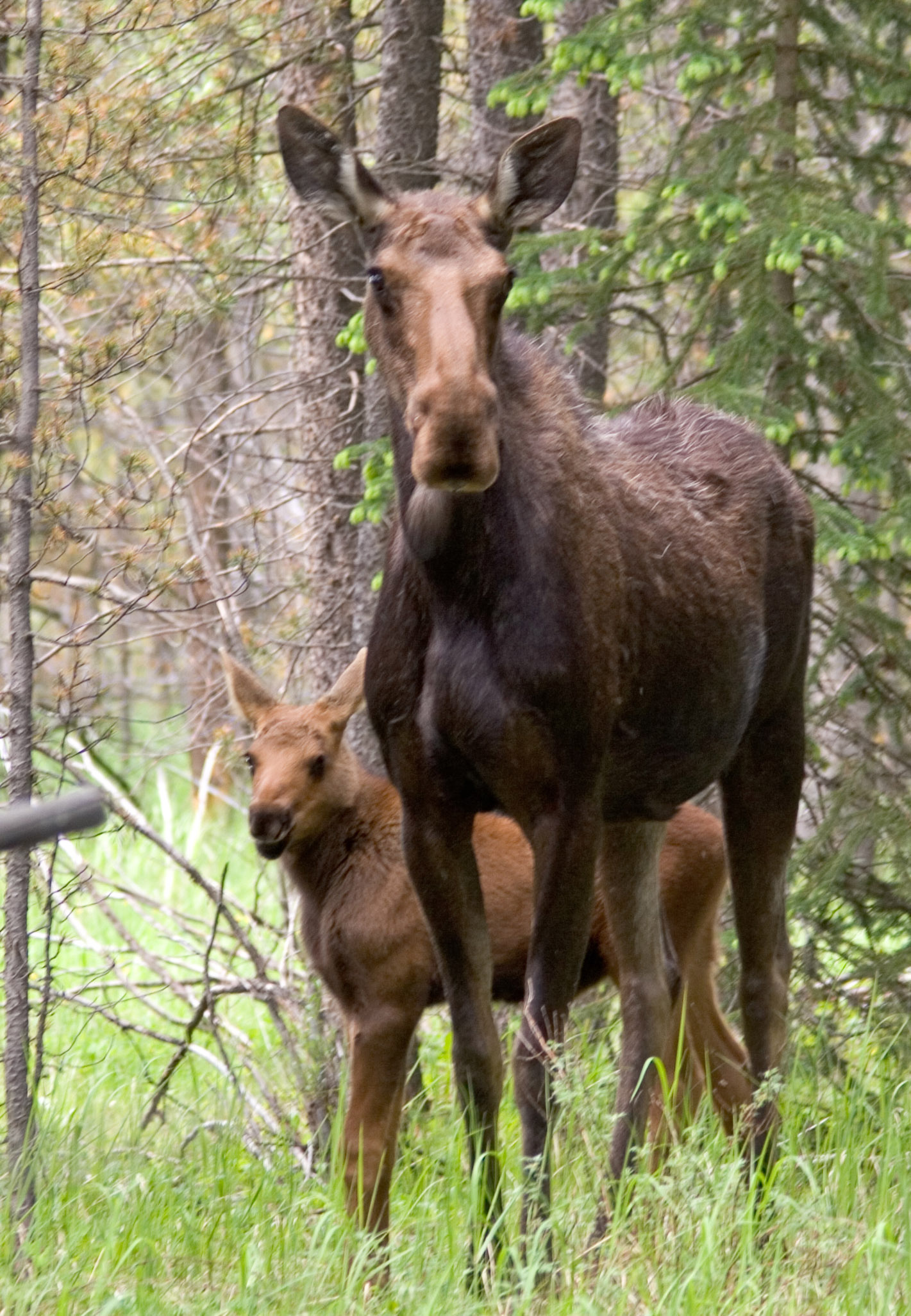
A moose and her calf

Order: Artiodactyla Family: Cervidae

- Moose, Alces alces, montane and subalpine forests, riparian, meadows, uncommon
- Elk, Cervus elaphus, montane, and subalpine forests, meadows, tundra, abundant
- Mule deer, Odocoileus hemionus, montane and subalpine forests, meadows, common
- White-tailed deer, Odocoileus virginianus, montane forests, meadows, occasional

== Canids ==
Order: Carnivora Family: Canidae

- Coyote, Canis latrans, montane and subalpine forests, meadows, tundra, common
- Gray wolf, Canis lupus, montane and subalpine forests, meadows, tundra, extirpated EX
- Gray fox, Urocyon cineoargentus, montane forests, meadows, unconfirmed
- Red fox, Vulpes vulpes, montane and subalpine forests, meadows, common

== Cats ==
Order: Carnivora Family: Felidae

- Canada lynx, Lynx canadensis, subalpine forests, rare
- Bobcat, Lynx rufus, montane and subalpine forests, meadows, common
- Cougar, Puma concolor, montane and subalpine forests, uncommon

== Skunks ==
Order: Carnivora Family: Mephitidae

- Striped skunk, Mephitis mephitis, montane forests, meadows, riparian, uncommon
- Western spotted skunk, Spilogale gracilis, montane forests, meadows, riparian, rare

== Weasels ==
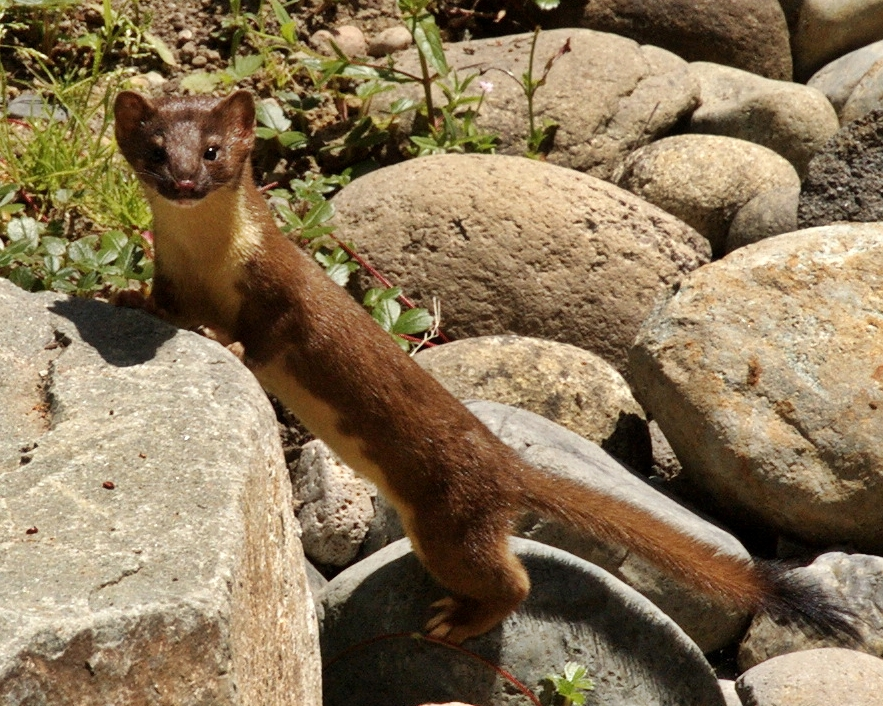
A long-tailed weasel

Order: Carnivora Family: Mustelidae

- Wolverine, Gulo gulo, subalpine forests, alpine tundra, occasional
- North American river otter, Lontra canadensis, rivers, riparian, uncommon
- American marten, Martes americana, montane and subalpine forests, uncommon
- Ermine, Mustela erminea, montane and subalpine forests, alpine tundra, meadows, uncommon
- Long-tailed weasel, Mustela frenata, montane and subalpine forests, alpine tundra, meadows, common
- American mink, Mustela vison, rivers, lakes, riparian, rare
- American badger, Taxidea taxus, meadows, grasslands, uncommon

== Raccoons and Ringtails ==
Order: Carnivora Family: Procyonidae

- Common raccoon, Procyon lotor, montane forests, riparian, uncommon
- Ring-tailed cat, Bassariscus astutus, montane forests, riparian, rare, if present

== Bears ==
Order: Carnivora Family: Ursidae

- Grizzly bear, Ursus arctos, montane and subalpine forests, alpine tundra, meadows, extirpated EX
- American black bear, Ursus americanus, montane and subalpine forests, common

== Bats ==
Order: Chiroptera Family: Vespertilionidae

- Silver-haired bat, Lasionycteris noctivagans, montane and subalpine forests, riparian, meadows, common
- Hoary bat, Lasiurus cinereus, montane and subalpine forests, riparian, meadows, uncommon
- Western small-footed myotis, Myotis ciliolabrum, montane forests, riparian, meadows rare, if present
- Long-eared myotis, Myotis evotis, montane and subalpine forests, riparian, meadows, uncommon
- Little brown bat, Myotis lucifugus, montane and subalpine forests, riparian, meadows, uncommon
- Big brown bat, Eptesicus fuscus, montane and subalpine forests, riparian, meadows, rare, if present
- Long-legged myotis, Myotis volans, montane forests, riparian, meadows, uncommon
- Townsend's big-eared bat, Plecotus townsendii, montane and subalpine forest, riparian, meadows, rare, if present

== Free-tailed bats ==
Order: Chiroptera Family: Molossidae

- Brazilian free-tailed bat, Tadarida brasiliensis, montane forests, meadows, rocky areas, rare, if present

== Hares and rabbits ==
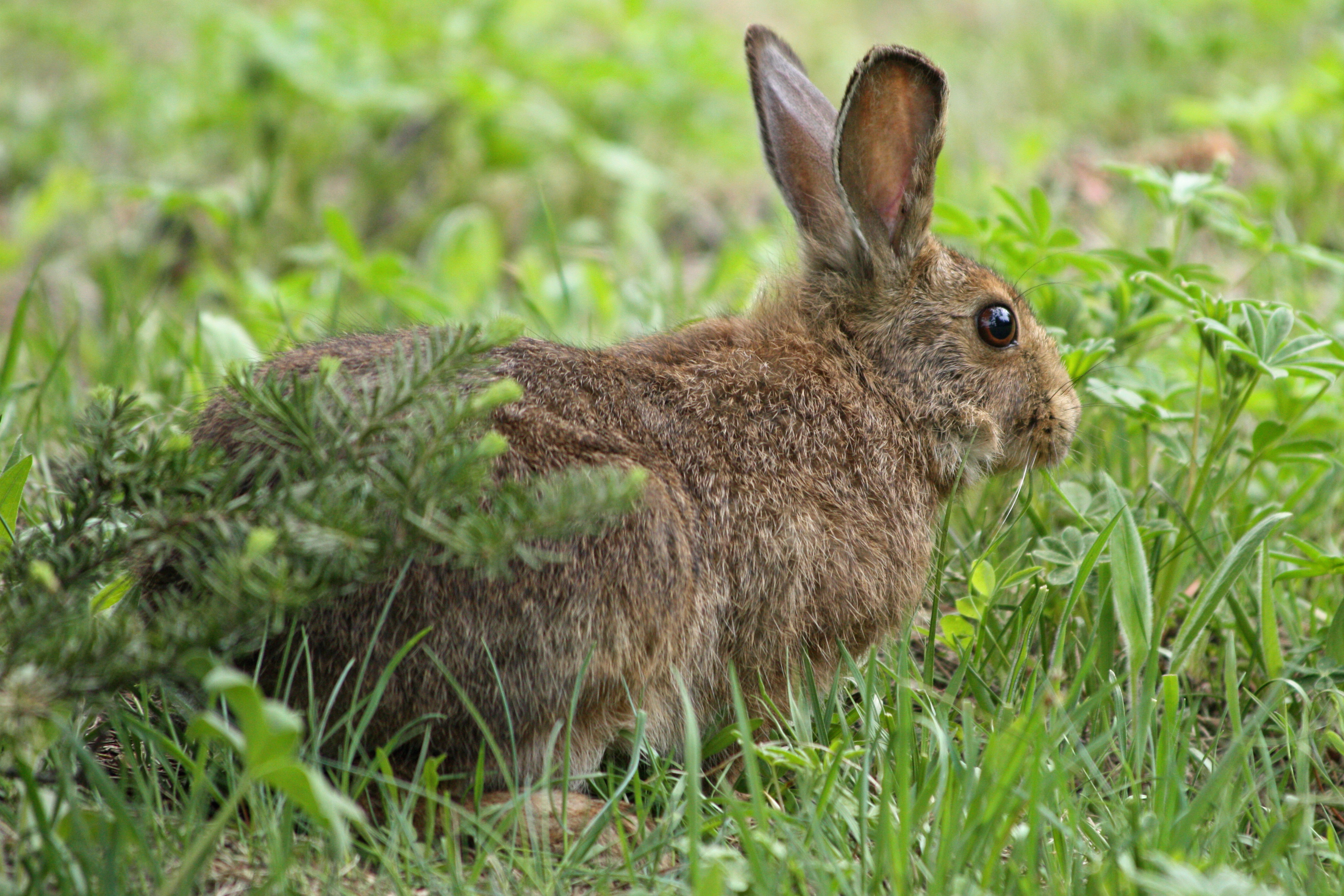
A snowshoe hare in its summer coat

Order: Lagomorpha Family: Leporidae

- Snowshoe hare, Lepus americanus, montane and subalpine forests, meadows, alpine tundra, common
- White-tailed jackrabbit, Lepus townsendii, montane and subalpine forests, meadows, alpine tundra, rare
- Mountain cottontail, Sylvilagus nuttallii, montane forests, riparian, meadows, uncommon
- Eastern cottontail, Sylvilagus floridanus, montane forests, rare, if present

== Pikas ==
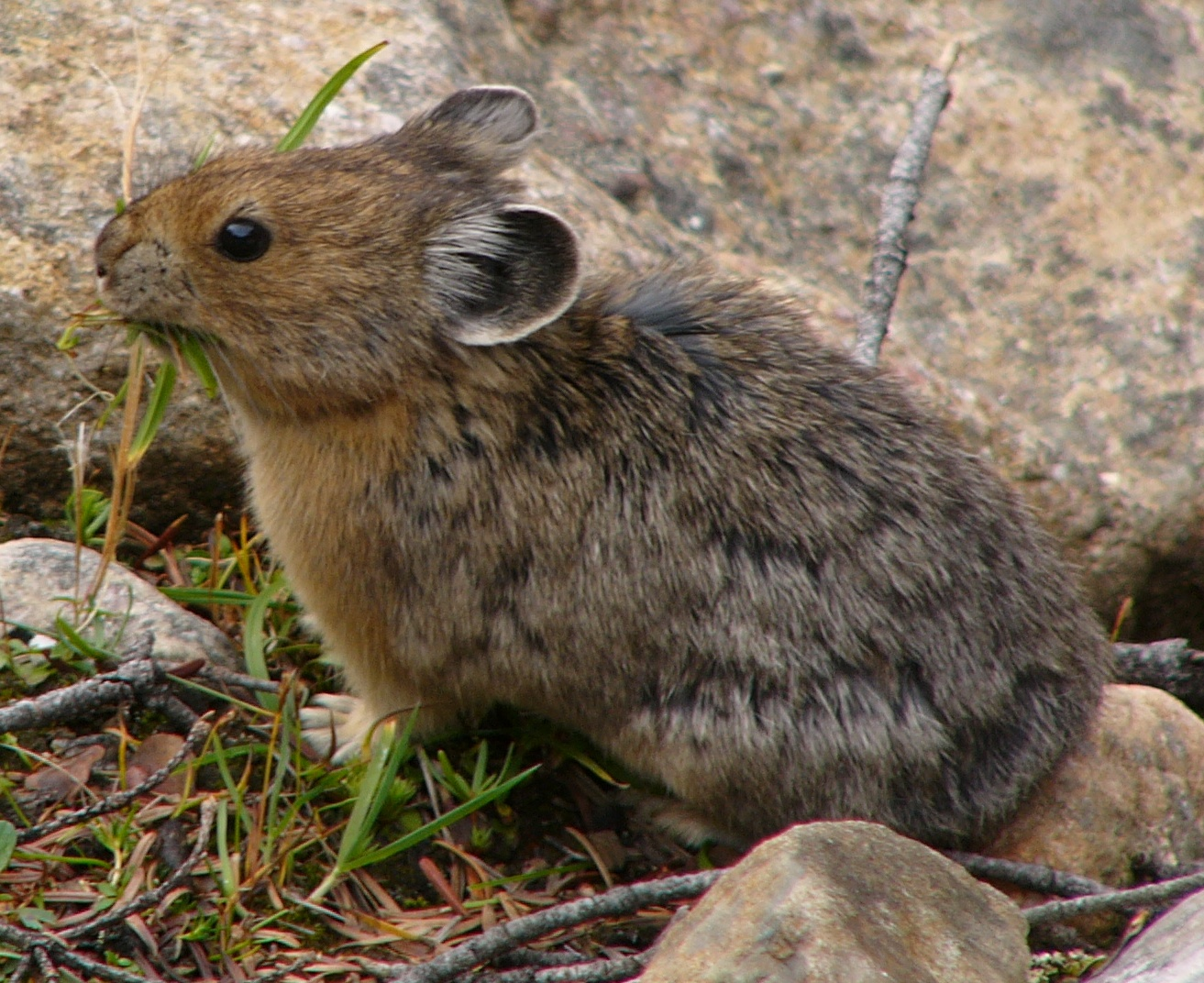
An American pika

Order: Lagomorpha Family: Ochotonidae

- American pika, Ochotona princeps, rocky areas, alpine tundra, common

== Beavers ==
Order: Rodentia Family: Castoridae

- American beaver, Castor canadensis, rivers, streams, lakes, riparian, uncommon

== Voles and mice ==
Order: Rodentia Family: Cricetidae

- Southern red-backed vole, Clethrionomys gapperi, montane and subalpine forests, common
- Long-tailed vole, Microtus longicaudis, montane and subalpine forests, meadows, riparian, uncommon
- Montane vole, Microtus montanus, meadows, riparian, common
- Meadow vole, Microtus pennsylvanicus, meadows, riparian, rare, if present
- Sagebrush vole, Lagurus curtatus, meadows, sagebrush flats, rare, if present
- Bushy-tailed woodrat, Neotoma cinerea, montane and subalpine forests, meadows, riparian, uncommon
- Mexican woodrat, Neotoma mexicana, montane forests, meadows, riparian, rare, if present
- Common muskrat, Ondatra zibethicus, marshes, lakes, riparian, uncommon
- Deer mouse, Peromyscus maniculatus, montane and subalpine forests, meadows, riparian, alpine tundra, abundant
- Northern rock mouse, Peromyscus nasutus, montane forests, meadows, riparian, uncommon
- Western heather vole, Phenacomus intermedius, montane and subalpine forests, meadows, alpine tundra, uncommon

== Jumping mice ==
Order: Rodentia Family: Dipodidae

- Western jumping mouse, Zapus princeps, deciduous forests, meadows, riparian, common

== Porcupines ==
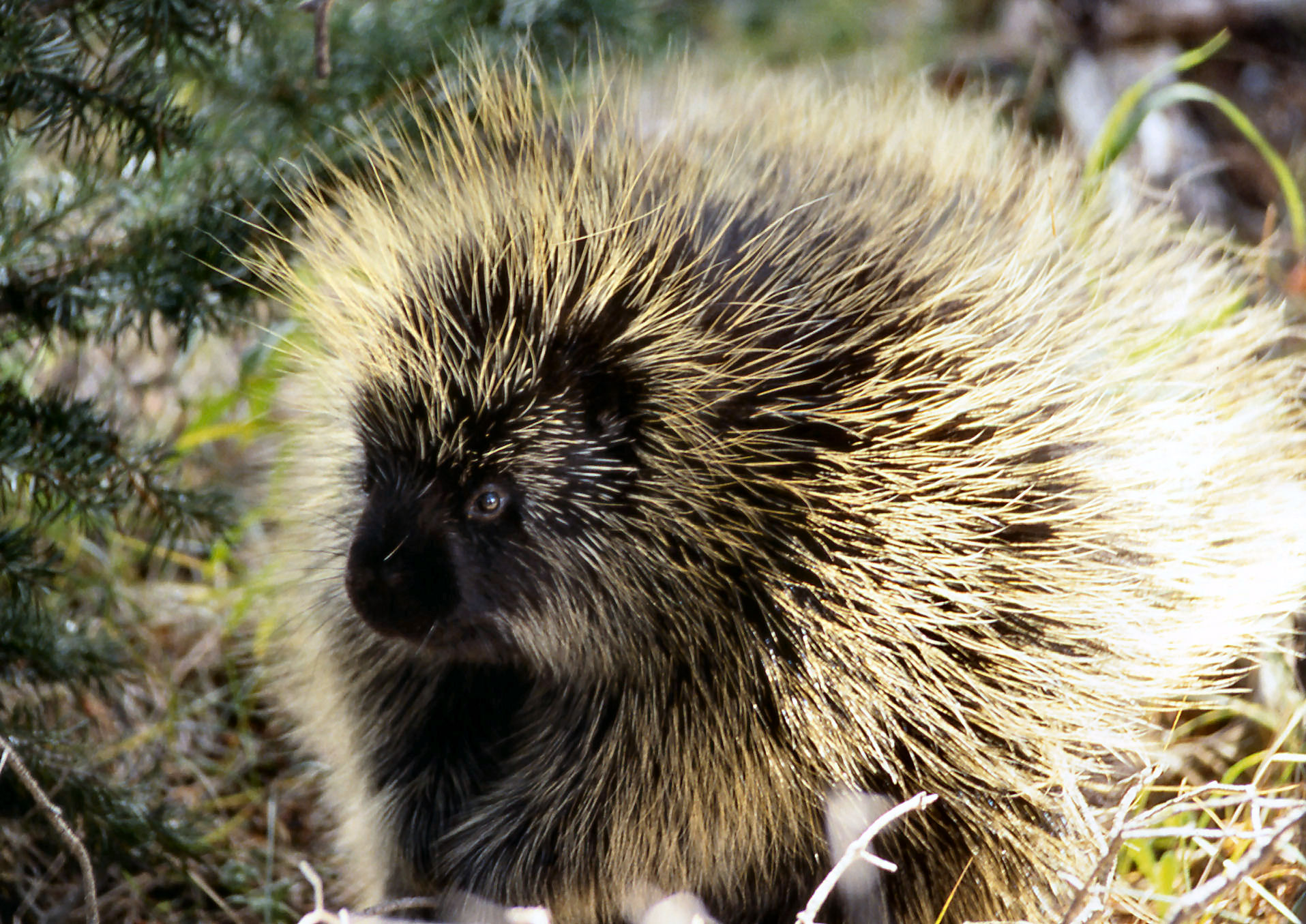
A North American porcupine

Order: Rodentia Family: Erethizontidae

- North American porcupine, Erethizon dorsatum, montane and subalpine forests, riparian, uncommon

== Pocket gophers ==
Order: Rodentia Family: Geomyidae

- Northern pocket gopher, Thomomys talpoides, meadows, alpine tundra, common

== Squirrels ==
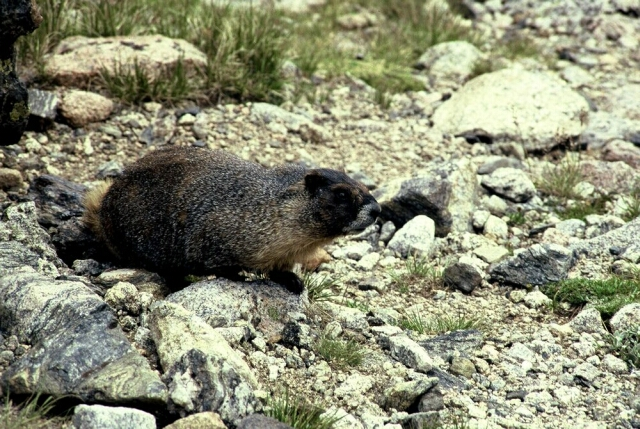
A yellow-bellied marmot

Order: Rodentia Family: Sciuridae

- Yellow-bellied marmot, Marmota flaviventris, montane and subalpine forests, meadows, alpine tundra, common
- Abert's squirrel, Sciurus aberti, montane ponderosa pine forests, uncommon
- Fox squirrel, Sciurus niger, riparian, rare (Non-native)
- Wyoming ground squirrel, Urocitellus elegans, montane forests, meadows, common
- Golden-mantled ground squirrel, Spermophilus lateralis, montane and subalpine forests, meadows, riparian, common
- Rock squirrel, Spermophilus variegiatus, montane forests, rare, if present
- Least chipmunk, Tamias minimas, montane and subalpine forests, meadows, riparian, common
- Colorado chipmunk, Tamias quadrivittatus, montane forests, meadows, rare, if present
- Uinta chipmunk, Neotamias umbrinus, montane and subalpine forests, meadows, riparian, common
- Pine squirrel, Tamiasciurus hudsonicus, montane and subalpine forests, riparian, common

== Shrews ==
Order: Soricomorpha Family: Soricidae

- Masked shrew, Sorex cinereus, montane and subalpine forests, riparian, meadow, alpine tundra, common
- American pygmy shrew, Sorex hoyi, montane and subalpine forests, riparian, meadow, uncommon
- Montane shrew, Sorex monticolus, montane and subalpine forests, riparian, meadow, common
- Dwarf shrew, Sorex nanus, subalpine forests, meadow, alpine tundra, rare
- American water shrew, Sorex palustris, lakes, streams, marshes, riparian, uncommon
