= Bats of Canada =

There are eighteen indigenous species of bats in Canada, which are found in many parts of the country. They are insectivores, and are prey to falcons, hawks, owls, snakes, cats, and raccoons.

== Species ==
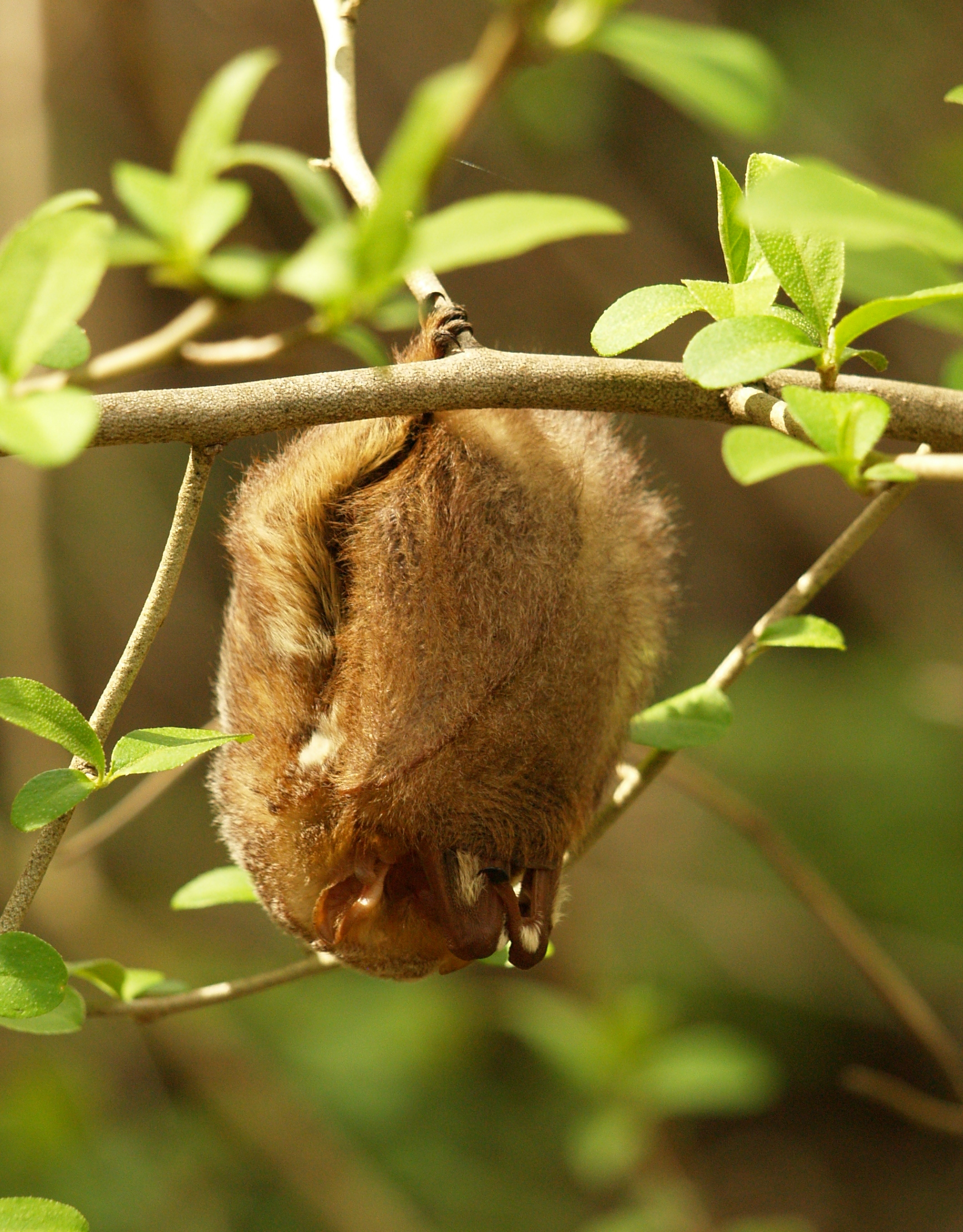
A red bat roosting in a tree

The little brown bat is the most common and widely distributed of Canada's bat species.The nocturnal bat roosts in dark places during the day, and preys on insects at night. Their echolocation calls are emitted 20 times per second, increasing to 200 times per second while chasing prey.

The habitat range of the big brown bat is in the southern parts of Quebec, Ontario, Manitoba, Saskatchewan, and British Columbia, and throughout Alberta. Males are solitary, whereas females "gather in maternity colonies in the spring and summer", consisting of up to 75 adults with their offspring. They forage at night on dry, warm evenings, catching and eating flying insects in the air. They hibernate in the winter, migrating short distances to find an appropriate roost, such as mines and caves.

The largest bat in Canada is the hoary bat, which inhabits all of Alberta, southern British Columbia, the southern half of Manitoba and Saskatchewan, most of Ontario, New Brunswick, and Nova Scotia, and the southern parts of Quebec. The solitary bat has a coat of grey fur with white tipped hairs, giving it a "frosted" or "hoary" appearance. They roost in trees, and prey on large insects such as wasps, dragonflies, beetles, and moths.

Northern long-eared myotis bats are found throughout Eastern Canada, southern Manitoba, northern Alberta, and parts of British Columbia, Saskatchewan, the Northwest Territories, and Yukon. It hibernates in caves and mines, and perches to eat insect prey.

Sometimes observed in British Columbia, the solitary red bat is generally found throughout the southern parts of Canada from Alberta to Nova Scotia. The slow, graceful flying bat migrates south in groups in the autumn and winter. It preys on flying insects, and roosts in trees and shrubs.

The reclusive silver-haired bat resembles the hoary bat, but has a "deep chocolate brown color with a white frosting on its back and abdomen". Its habitat is primarily forested areas in the southern parts of Canada, where it is common and roosts alone in logs or under bark, but it is also found in grassland. Groups congregate for southward migration in the autumn and winter, though some individuals may undergo torpor and hibernate instead. Its preferred food is small, flying insects, especially moths, for which they forage after sunset in forest canopies or over streams and stagnant waters.

=== Eastern Canada ===
The tricoloured bat is the smallest of Canada's indigenous bat species. Formerly known as the eastern pipistrelle, genetic analysis has shown it is not a pipistrelle but most closely related to the canyon bat. It is known as the tricoloured bat because it has fur in three colours: a base of grey, body of yellow, and tips in brown. It has a habitat range along southern Ontario, the southernmost parts of Quebec, most of Nova Scotia, and part of New Brunswick. In late summer and early autumn, they migrate to caves where they hibernate. It is a slow flyer, preferring slow-moving rivers and adjacent forests and woodlands.

The eastern small-footed bat is one of the smallest North American bats, and one of the least common in Canada. Its range is restricted to deciduous and coniferous forests in southern and central Ontario and the southernmost part of Quebec. A cold-tolerant bat, it enters hibernation later than other species, usually late November or early December. It is identifiable by its slow, erratic flight.

=== Western Canada ===
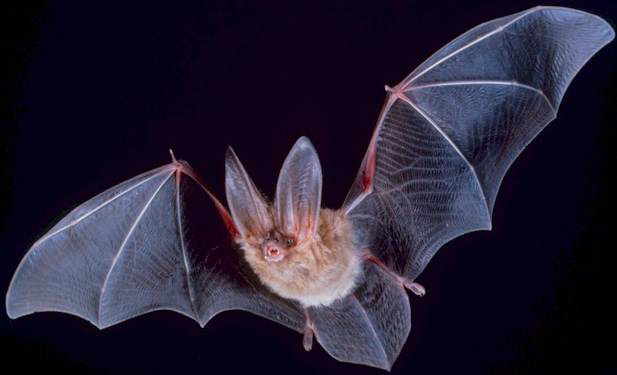
A western big-eared bat in flight

The California myotis habitat ranges into much of southern British Columbia and along most of its coast. It is a nocturnal predator of insects, which it catches and eats in flight "over lakes, rivers, meadows, and forest clearings", or any other open area. They are sometimes used to control insect populations. They hibernate in the winter, especially at higher elevations.

The fringed myotis is a vesper bat with a narrow distribution in Canada, primarily in the Okanagan. Its habitat is in vegetated areas. It is a fast-growing species, and the young reach adult size within three weeks. About 70% of its diet consists of beetles.

Keen's myotis is found along the British Columbia coast and toward the interior. They hibernate in winter, sometimes forming a hibernaculum with other bat species in the region. They prefer forested areas, feeding on insects. The species is particularly active after sunset and before dawn.

The long-eared myotis is a vesper bat whose fur colour ranges from dark brown to pale yellow. It roosts in "rock outcroppings and dead trees" in the southern parts of British Columbia, Alberta, and Saskatchewan. They hunt over small bodies of water or dense vegetation, preferring moths and beetles.

Mountainous and rugged terrains are preferred by the long-legged myotis, which has habitats throughout coastal and southern British Columbia and near the Rocky Mountains in the southern half of Alberta. There, they inhabit coniferous forests and woodlands near streams, and eat soft-bodied insects, preferring moths.

The western big-eared bat, also known as Townsend's big-eared bat, has prominent wing-like ears. It is a social creature, gathering in large clusters in its range in parts southern British Columbia, and females will congregate in maternity groups in the spring. It preys on moths in "open pasture and forest canopy". In the winter, it will hibernate in nearby caves, and on cool or cold days the rest of the year individuals will enter torpor.

The yellow-brown backed western small-footed bat has a range of southern British Columbia, Alberta, and Saskatchewan. It roosts alone or in small groups, preferring damp caves, mines, or rock crevices. It is an insectivore, eating moths, beetles, and ants.

The Yuma myotis, similar in appearance to the little brown bat, is found primarily in the coastal regions of southern British Columbia. It feeds on soft insects as it cruises low over small bodies of water, and prefers forest clearings.

=== Species at risk ===
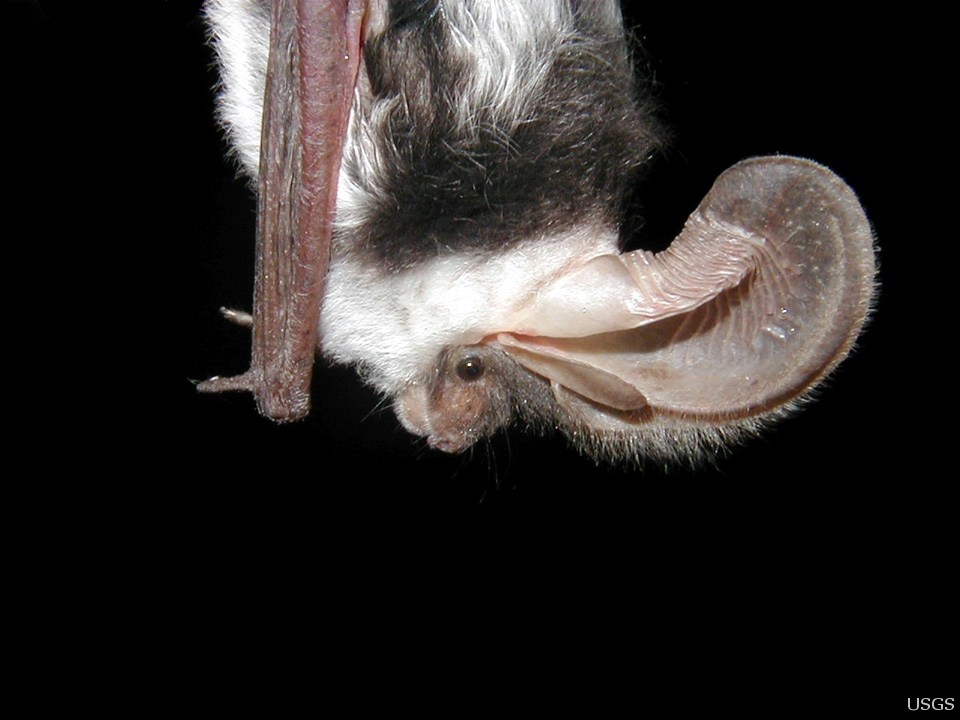
A spotted bat, of which there are fewer than 100 in Canada.

The pallid bat (Antrozous pallidus) is characterized by slate grey wings, cream or pale yellow-brown fur on its body, tan-coloured ears, and eyes larger than those of most bats. Its range in Canada is restricted to the Okanagan Valley in southern British Columbia, as its preferred habitat is open, arid and semi-arid terrain with sparse vegetation or cultivated fields or dry grasslands, and roost in the crevices of cliffs. It is a threatened species in Canada, where its population is "unknown but it likely is quite small", and is on the list of wildlife species at risk maintained by Committee on the Status of Endangered Wildlife in Canada (COSEWIC) via Environment Canada. The primary risk to the pallid bat in Canada is "the harsh climate and naturally low availability of adequate habitat" and continued habitat loss from development, as well as pesticide use in fruit-growing areas within their habitats; they eat insects including beetles, grasshoppers, and moths. It is protected by the Species at Risk Act (SARA) on federally-owned lands, including Vaseux-Bighorn National Wildlife Area and nearby First Nations lands, and is also protected by the British Columbia Wildlife Act.

The spotted bat (Euderma maculatum) is a species of special concern in Canada. The large-eared black bats were first discovered in Canada in 1979, with a range restricted to southern British Columbia. These solitary mammals prefer habitats along waterways in regions with hot summers and mild winters, preferring to roost on cliffs. There are fewer than 100 spotted bats in Canada, an insectivore threatened by the use of pesticides which is also an endangered species in the United States, and it is also protected by the Species at Risk Act and the British Columbia Wildlife Act.

The little brown bat, northern long-eared myotis, and the tricoloured bat are currently being considered for protection under the Species at Risk Act.

=== Distribution ===
Species		Status		Distribution												
Common name	Nomenclature	Canada	Global	BC	AB	SK	MB	ON	QC	NB	PEI	NS	NL	YK	NT	NU
Big brown bat	Eptesicus fuscus															
California myotis	Myotis californicus															
Eastern small-footed myotis	Myotis leibii															
Fringed myotis	Myotis thysanodes															
Hoary bat	Lasiurus cinereus															
Little brown bat (myotis)	Myotis lucifugus															
Long-eared myotis	Myotis evotis															
Long-legged myotis	Myotis volans															
Northern myotis	Myotis septentrionalis															
Pallid bat	Antrozous pallidus															
Eastern red bat	Lasiurus borealis															
Silver-haired bat	Lasionycteris noctivagans															
Spotted bat	Euderma maculatum															
Tricoloured bat	Perimyotis subflavus															
Townsend's big-eared bat	Corynorhinus townsendii															
Western small-footed myotis	Myotis ciliolabrum															
Yuma myotis	Myotis yumanensis															
Total species	17			15	9	8	6	8	8	7	1	6	2	2	6	0

There has also been one recorded sighting of an evening bat (Nycticeius humeralis) on Pelee Island, Ontario, from 1911, which is thought to be a stray occurrence. There has been at least one recorded sighting of a big free-tailed bat (Nyctinomops macrotis) in British Columbia. There has also been one sighting of a hoary bat on the island of Newfoundland.

== Disease ==
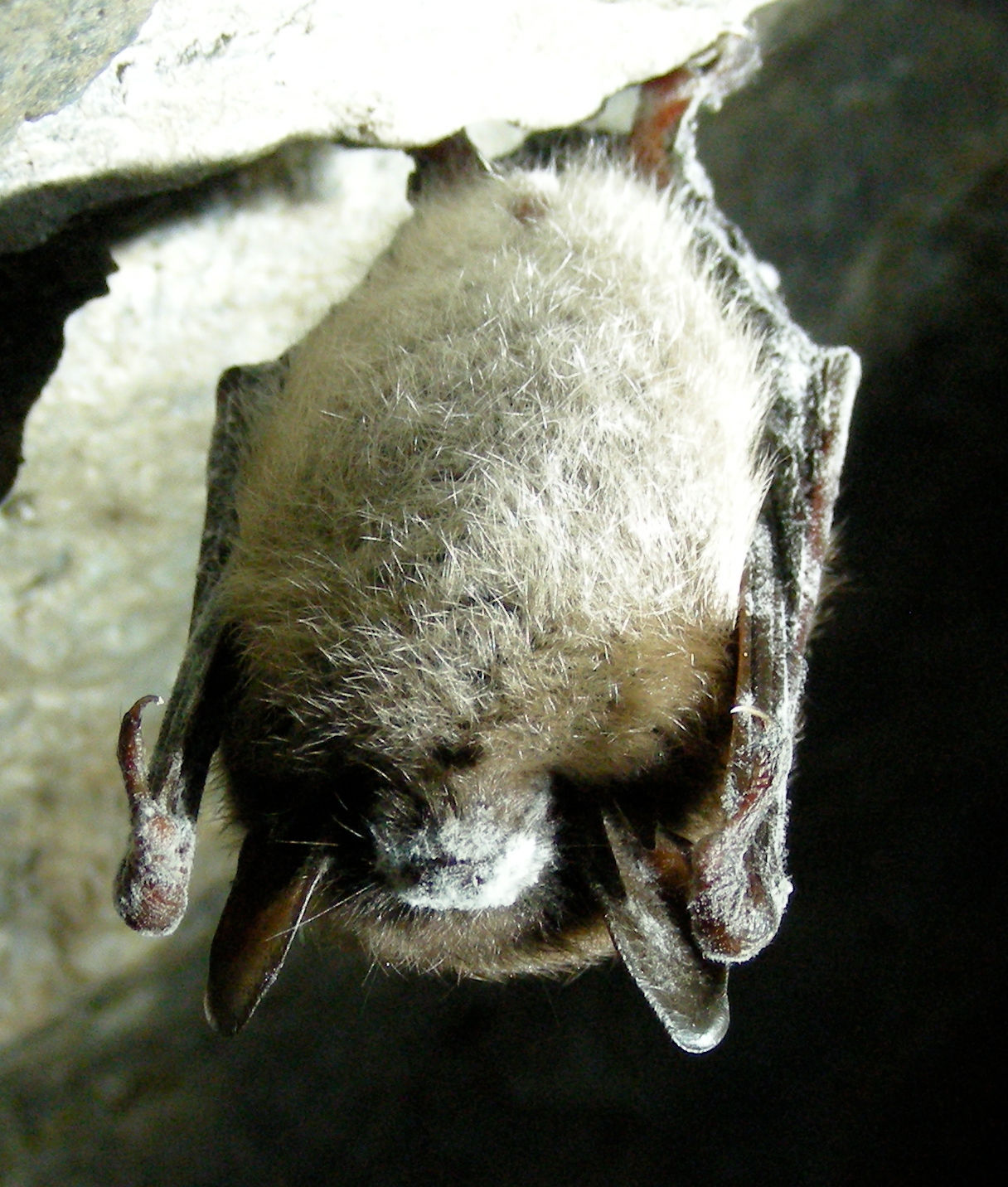
A little brown bat with white nose syndrome. The fungus Pseudogymnoascus destructans covers parts of the face, ears, and wings.

In 2010, white nose syndrome was first confirmed in Canadian bat colonies in central and eastern Ontario and Quebec. In 2011 and 2012, the spread of white nose syndrome destroyed a colony of 6,000 bats in a cave in New Brunswick. The disease is spread by the fungus Pseudogymnoascus destructans, an invasive species which grows in the skin of the bat, and has affected bats from Eastern Ontario to the Maritimes. The fungus causes bats to warm prematurely and wake early from hibernation, forcing them to deplete their stores of fat before spring. It is believed that "human activity in caves is contributing to its spread", as humans may carry the disease on clothing or equipment to which bats may become exposed. Many agencies and organizations in jurisdictions in eastern Canada and eastern United States are coordinating research and conservation programs to prevent its spread, including the Ontario Ministry of Natural Resources and the United States Fish and Wildlife Service. The three species in Canada affected by the syndrome have been recommended for endangered species status. These are the little brown bat, northern long-eared myotis, and the tricoloured bat. By 2014, about 99% of brown-nosed bats in New Brunswick had died as a result of the disease, and it is considered functionally extirpated in some parts of eastern Canada. The disease was first detected in Manitoba bat populations in the Interlake Region in 2018. By 2023, the fungus had been detected in bat guano near the city of Grand Forks in British Columbia.

Bats may also transmit rabies to humans. Although rare, a bat bite or scratch, particularly from silver-haired bats, may result in rabies to humans, cats, or dogs. Rabid bats usually lose their ability to fly, and rarely become aggressive. Careless handling of bats is the main cause of rabies transmission. Since 2000, all the five human rabies cases contracted domestically in Canada were acquired from bats. Fewer than 2% of bats in Canada are rabid, 95% of which are big brown bats. Testing bats for rabies is usually performed by the Canadian Food Inspection Agency.

Inhalation of dusty bat manure may result in histoplasmosis, which will present as a mild respiratory infection.

There are no pesticides that may be used on bats in Canada.

== Conservation ==
In 2011, the Nature Conservancy of Canada received a $50,000 grant from Sustainable Forestry Initiative to research bat habitats for future conservation. The Ministry of Natural Resources in Ontario and independent biologists are monitoring bat populations.

In eastern Canada, all eight species have had reductions in populations as a result of destruction of bat roosts, deforestation, pesticide use, and cave exploration.
