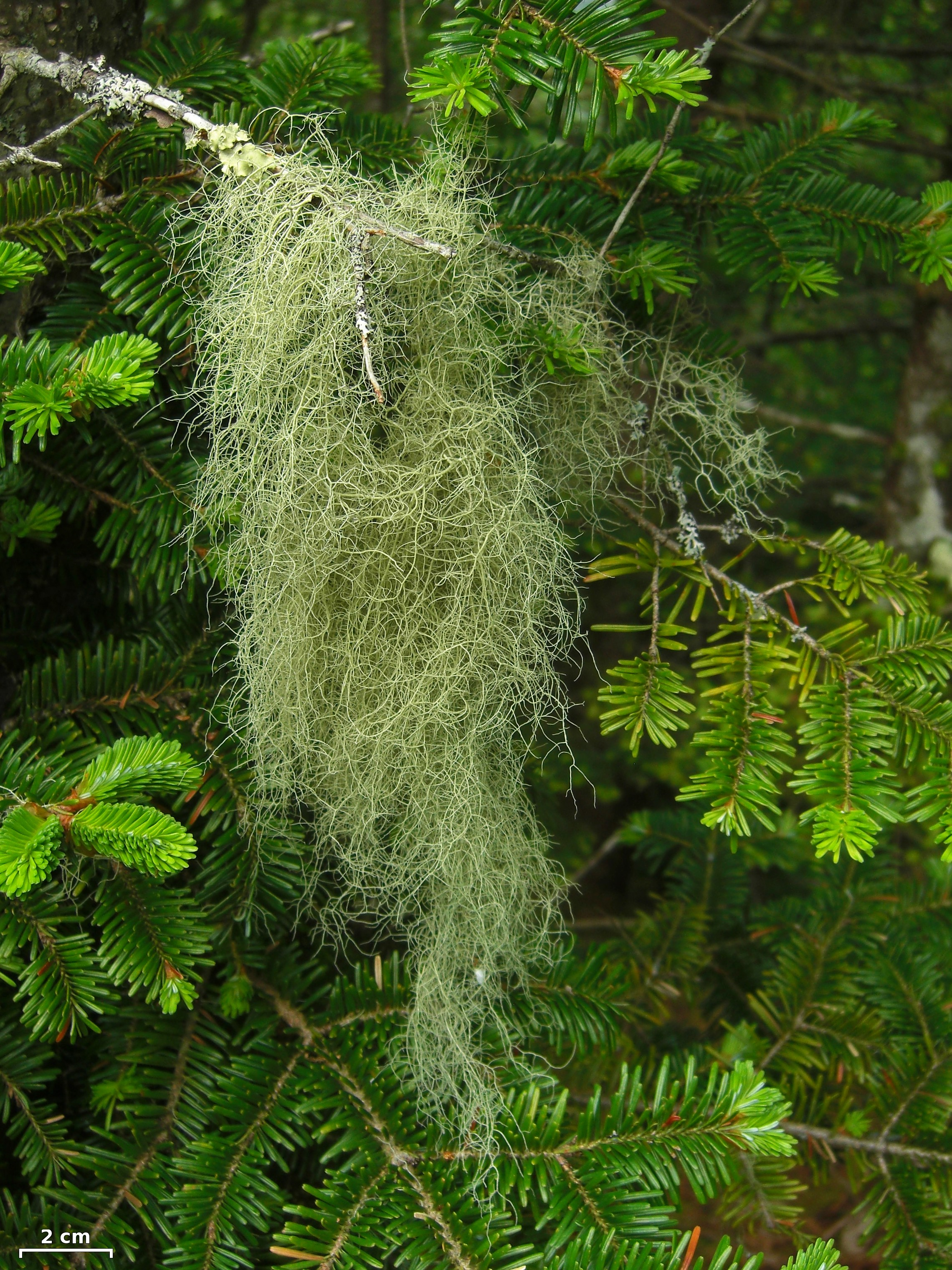

Conservation status
- Secure (NatureServe)

Scientific classification
- Kingdom: Fungi
- Division: Ascomycota
- Class: Lecanoromycetes
- Order: Lecanorales
- Family: Parmeliaceae
- Genus: Usnea
- Species: U. trichodea

Binomial name
- Usnea trichodea Ach. (1803)

= Usnea trichodea =

Bony beard lichen

Species of lichen

Usnea trichodea, commonly known as bony beard lichen, is a pale straw-colored fruticose lichen with a pendant growth form. It grows on trees and is native to eastern North America.

== Description ==
Usnea trichodea hangs from the branches and twigs of trees and can reach a length of 30 cm (12 in). The main branches are smooth and slender, with a diameter of less than 0.4 mm (0.02 in); they send out side-branches at an obtuse angle at intervals. The thallus is divided into articulating sections with raised cracks between; the medulla is dense and white while the axis is reddish-brown. It could be confused with Usnea longissima but the branching structure and reddish axis are distinctive.

== Distribution and habitat ==
Usnea trichodea occurs in eastern North America where it grows on trees. Its range extends from Ontario, New Brunswick, Newfoundland, Nova Scotia, Prince Edward Island, and eastern Quebec in Canada, southwards to Texas and Florida in the United States.

== Ecology ==
Some lichens are extremely sensitive to pollution, and it has been found that Usnea trichodea and Evernia spp. will sicken and die if exposed to sulphur dioxide. These lichens can be used as indicators of air pollution.

Researchers found that in Nova Scotia, the tricolored bat (Perimyotis subflavus), which roosts in tree foliage over much of its range, was roosting exclusively in the dangling thalli of Usnea trichodea; the lichen was typically growing on conifers, the majority of which were species of spruce. The authors of the study speculated that the tricolored bats might use the lichen, which contains usnic acid, to reduce parasitism, as the bats were found to be free of ectoparasites.
