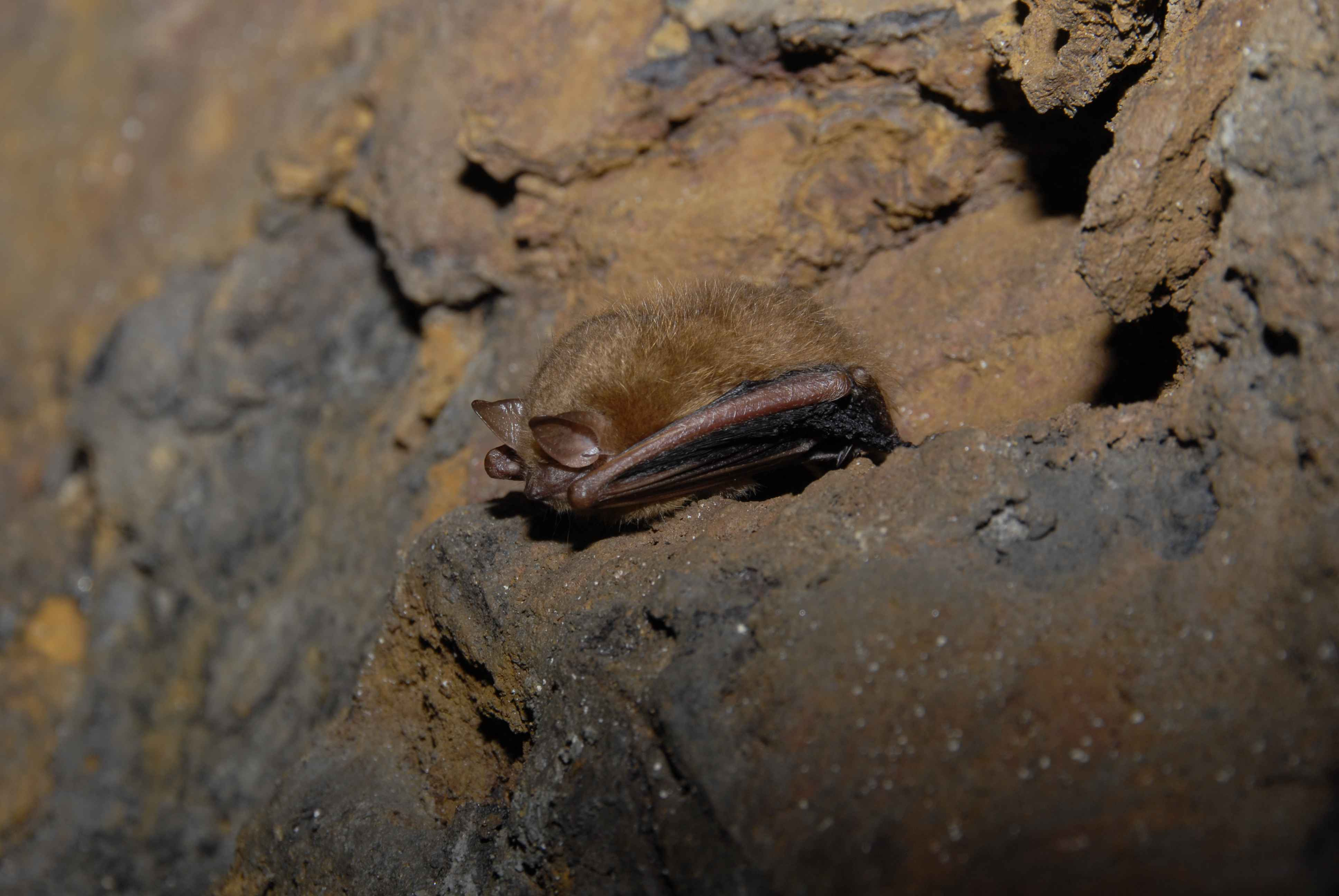
- Tricolored bat (Perimyotis subflavus)

Scientific classification
- Kingdom: Animalia
- Phylum: Chordata
- Class: Mammalia
- Order: Chiroptera
- Family: Vespertilionidae
- Subfamily: Vespertilioninae
- Tribe: Perimyotini

Genera
- Parastrellus; Perimyotis

= Perimyotini =

Tribe of bats

Perimyotini is a tribe of bats in the family Vespertilionidae. It contains two species of bats found in North America, each in their own monotypic genus.

Although this name is already in use by taxonomic authorities, such as the Handbook of the Mammals of the World, ITIS and the American Society of Mammalogists, and was first suggested as a name in a 2009 study, it has not actually been formally described.

== Species ==
There are two genera in the tribe, each with one species:

- Genus Parastrellus
  - Canyon bat, Parastrellus hesperus
- Genus Perimyotis
  - Tricolored bat, Perimyotis subflavus
