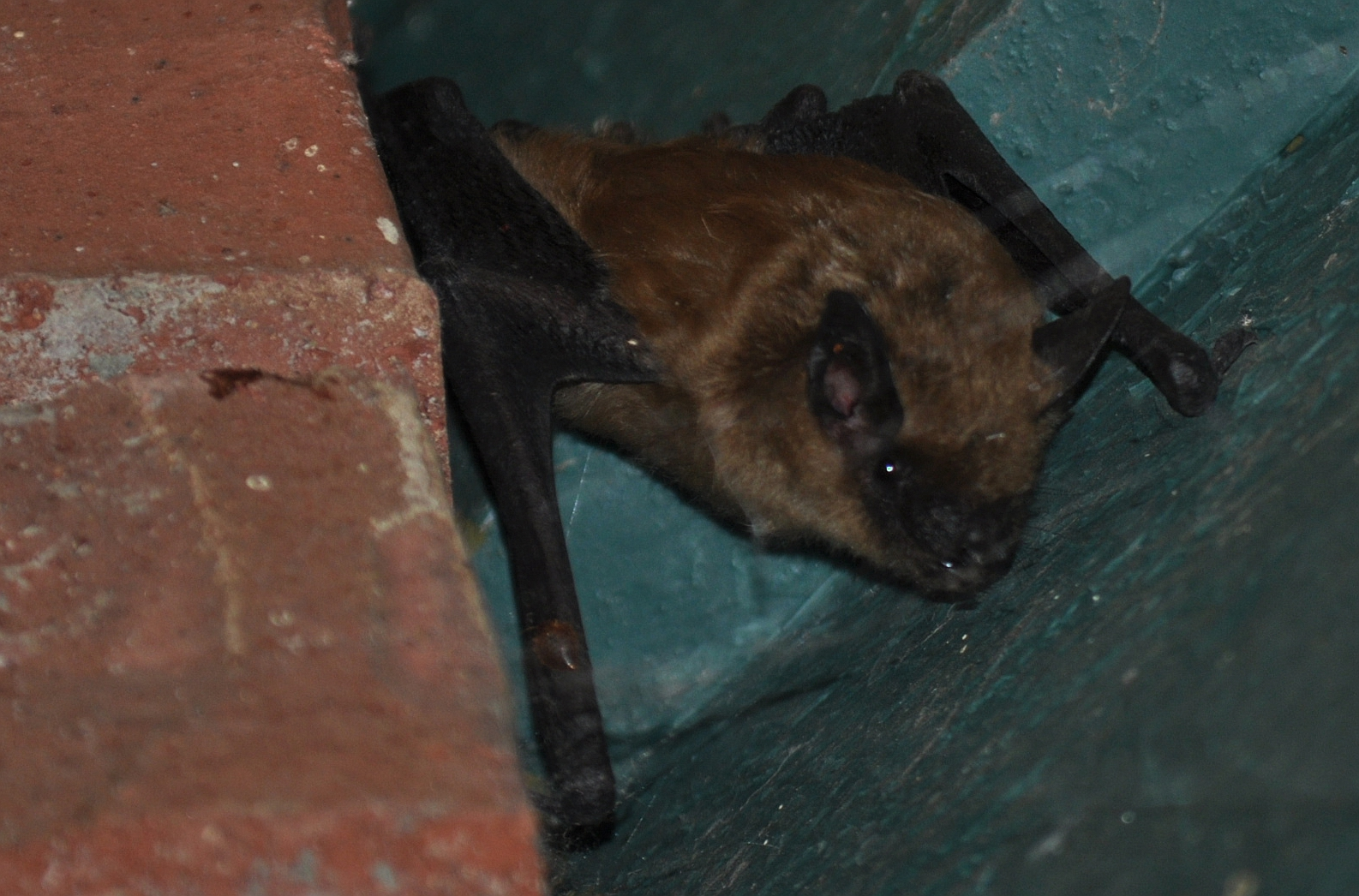

Conservation status
- Least Concern (IUCN 3.1)

Scientific classification
- Kingdom: Animalia
- Phylum: Chordata
- Class: Mammalia
- Order: Chiroptera
- Family: Vespertilionidae
- Genus: Myotis
- Species: M. californicus

Binomial name
- Myotis californicus (Audubon & Bachman, 1842)
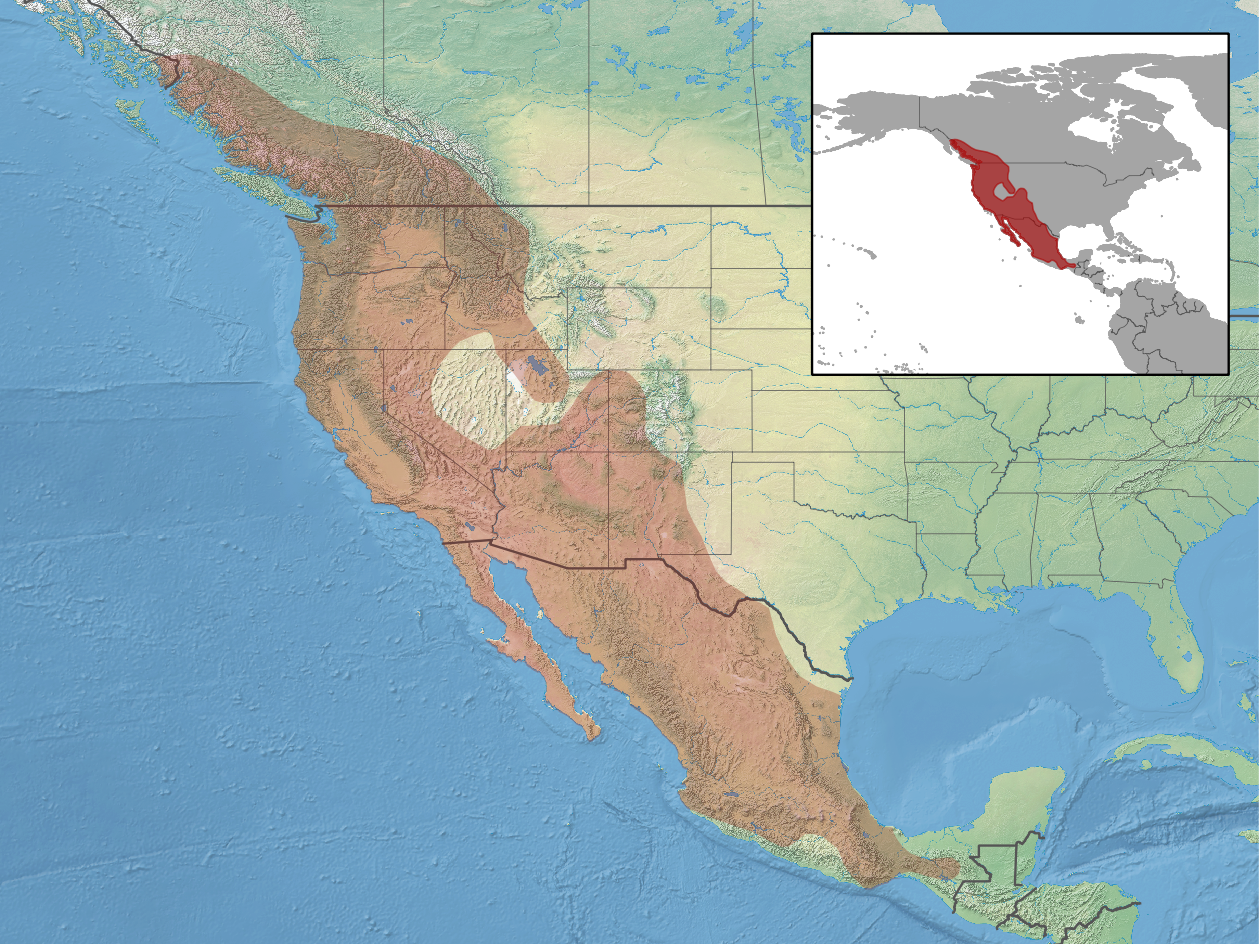

= California myotis =

Species of bat

The California myotis (Myotis californicus) is a species of vesper bat. It is found in British Columbia in Canada, Guatemala, Mexico, and in the western United States, including California.

== Description ==
=== Physical characteristics ===
The California myotis is a small (70–94 millimetres [2.8–3.7 in] and 3.3–5.4 grams [0.12–0.19 oz]) bat with pale, dull fur. Ears are of medium (12–15 millimetres [0.47–0.59 in]) size, with a narrow, pointed tragus (ear). They have an obviously keeled calcar and very small feet (5–7 millimetres [0.20–0.28 in]), smaller even than the feet of the western small-footed myotis, for which they are easily confused. The spread of the wings averages 220 millimetres (8.7 in). Other distinguishing features include the slightly lighter face mask and shorter appearance of the California myotis' tail. While their tails are the same length, the small-footed myotis' tail extends 2–3 millimetres (0.079–0.118 in) after the connecting membrane (Uropatagia) which makes it appear longer.

The California myotis is largely free of ectoparasites commonly found on other bat species, such as fleas, ticks, flies, lice, and bed bugs. However, mites have occasionally been found on the dorsal wings of the California myotis.

The dental formula for M. californicus is 2.1.3.33.1.3.3 × 2 = 38

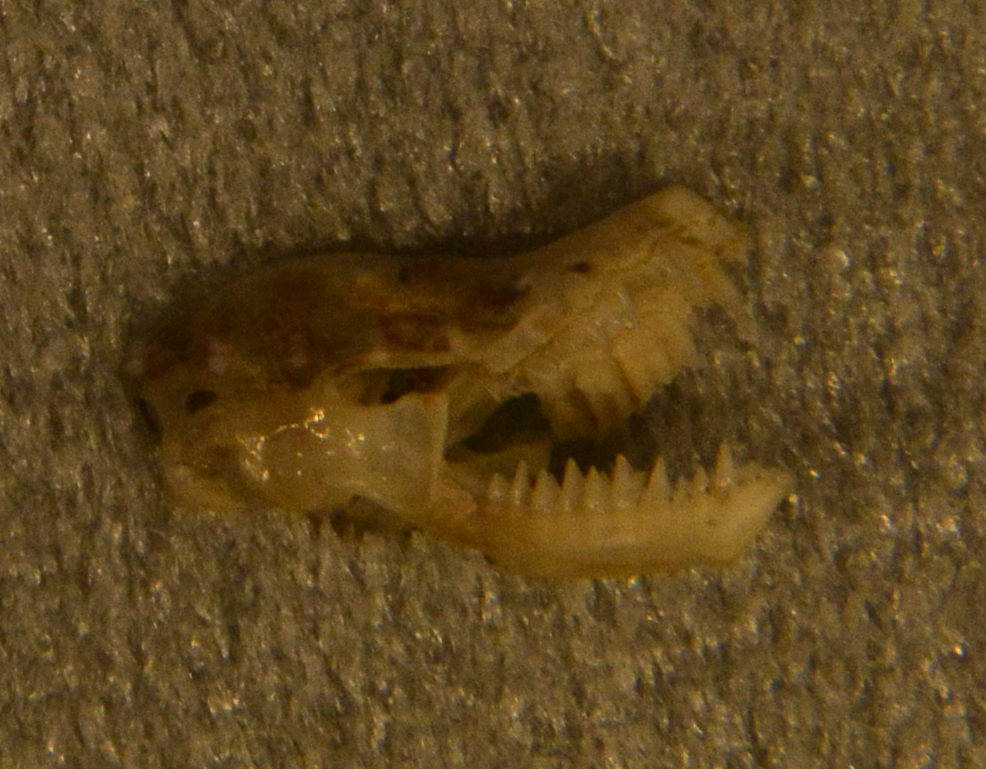
Skull of a California Myotis

=== Habitat and geographical range ===
Within California, the California myotis inhabits a variety of geographical areas, ranging from coastal environments to the desert. These bats are frequently observed around water sources in the desert, which are frequently close to rocky canyons or sandy flats. In coastal regions, the California myotis favors riparian groves with sycamore, willow, and cottonwood trees. They can also be discovered in open forests and oak groves.

== Behavior ==
=== Roosting activity ===
During the day, the California myotis will roost in the bark of dead trees, particularly ponderosa pines, rock crevices, or buildings. The California myotis prefers forested areas and is seldom found in urban environments or open rural spaces. However, they will occasionally roost in man-made structures like abandoned wooden houses, sign boards, and mine tunnels. Both male and female myotis tend to move around without a fixed preference for a specific or frequently used hiding place, instead choosing the most accessible hiding spot once they have finished foraging.

=== Foraging ===
The California myotis tend to emerge just after dusk and just before dawn to forage. Foraging is done close to the foliage of trees and larger shrubs, usually within a few feet of the ground. Diet includes moths, flies, and other flying insects. Their flight is slow and highly maneuverable, which assists in prey capture. The California myotis begins foraging right after sunset, feeding rapidly before finding a roosting site near their foraging grounds to rest for a period of time; this behavior is repeated until daybreak.

The California myotis seeks out water throughout the night, with certain watering holes being favored. In order to drink water, these bats will glide over the surface of the pond with their heads bent forward and jaw open, allowing them to scoop up water with their mouth.

=== Mating and reproduction ===
California myotis mate in the fall and give birth during the late spring (May - early June). For the remainder of the year, the adults of the two sexes prefer to remain separate, occasionally roosting together during the months of September, October, February, and March. Females give birth to one pup per year and can live for about 15 years in the wild. During the birthing season they form small maternity colonies of about 20 individuals, usually in the loose bark of trees or rock crevices. Males and non-reproductive females roost in small groups or alone. During the winter they may hibernate in mines or rock caves, or they may remain active all winter.

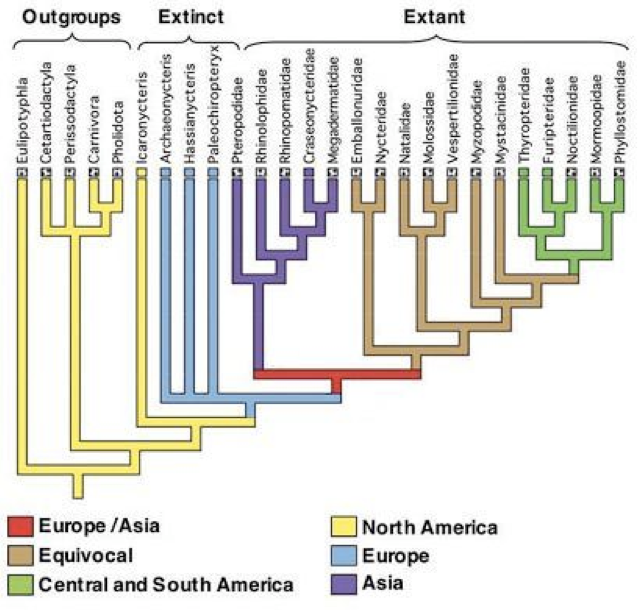
Cladogram showing the relatedness of bats, different colored branches correspond to the species' region.

== See also ==
- Bats of Canada
- Bats of the United States
