= Maternity colony =

Temporary association of reproductive female bats

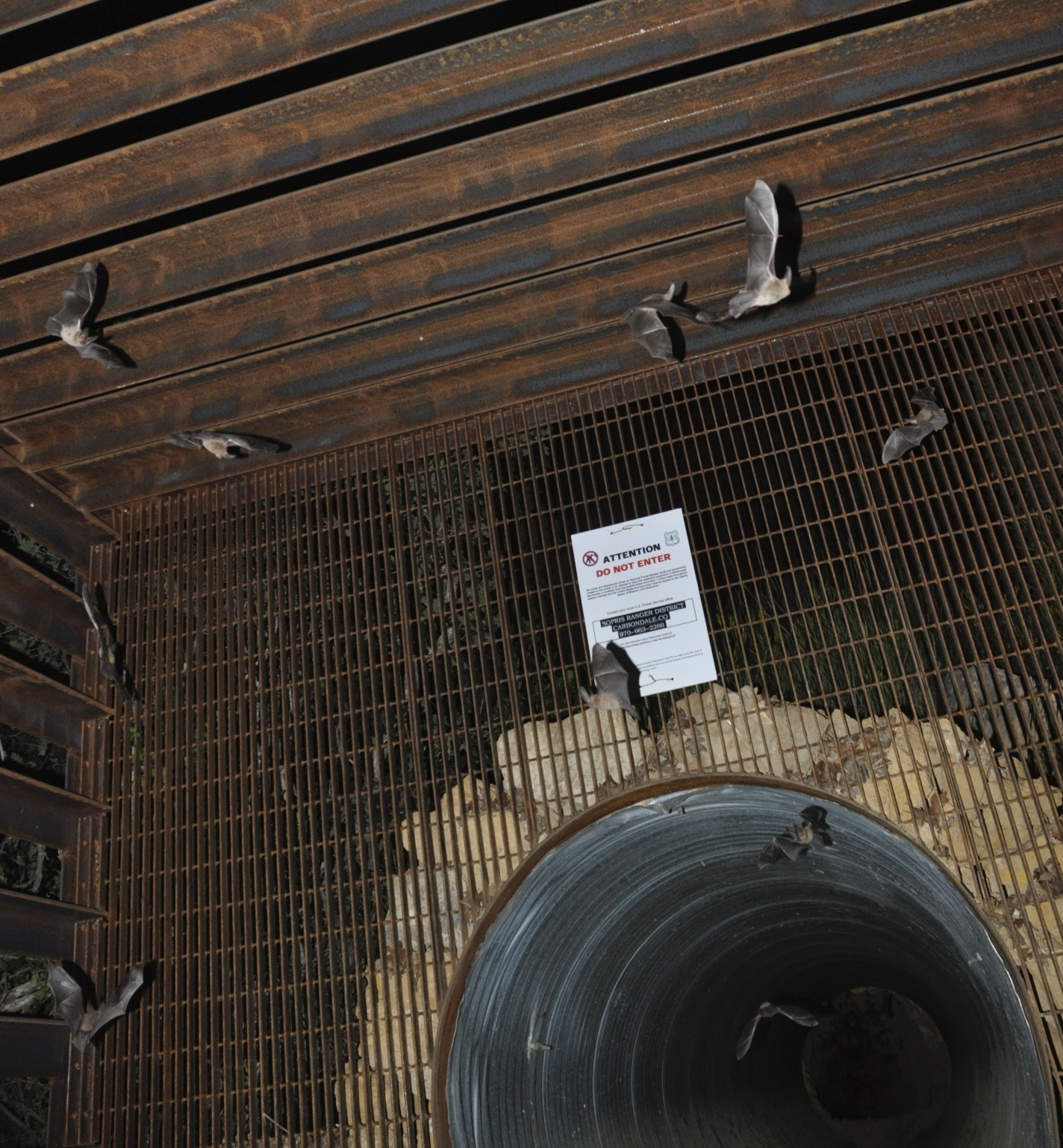
Townsend's big-eared bats exiting a maternity colony in a mine

A maternity colony is a temporary association of reproductive female bats for giving birth to, nursing, and weaning their pups. The colonies are initiated by pregnant bats. After giving birth, the colony consists of the lactating females and their offspring. After weaning, juveniles will leave the maternity colony, and the colony itself will break apart. The size of a maternity colony is highly variable by species, with some species forming colonies consisting of ten or fewer individuals, while the largest maternity colony in the world in Bracken Cave is estimated to have over 15 million bats.

== Benefits of a maternity colony ==
Maternity colonies are especially prevalent in temperate regions due to the thermal benefits of roosting with other individuals. Outside of the winter months, non-reproductive females and male bats enter torpor for short periods to conserve energy when temperatures are below an optimum threshold. However, torpor is detrimental to reproductive females because it delays the development of the fetus and slows milk production. Therefore, female bats are highly incentivized to maintain a constant body temperature. Roosting in a large group allows females to share body heat, lowering the energetic costs for individuals.

== Risks of a maternity colony ==
Roosting in large groups brings risks to the members of a maternity colony. Predators such as hawks and owls can learn to anticipate the emergence of bats from a specific roost at sunset. Smaller colonies are thought to be less risky than larger colonies, because the nightly emergence of bats would attract less attention.

== Species that form maternity colonies ==
Incomplete list
Common name	Scientific name	Range	Maternity colony size
Family: Vespertilionidae
Little brown bat	Myotis lucifugus	U.S., Canada	107-349
Southeastern myotis	Myotis austroriparius	Southeastern U.S.	1000+
Fringed myotis	Myotis thysanodes	Canada, Western U.S., Mexico	40-200
Indiana bat	Myotis sodalis	Midwestern U.S.	30-300
Northern long-eared bat	Myotis septentrionalis	Eastern U.S., Canada	11-65
Bechstein's bat	Myotis bechsteinii	Europe, Asia	15-40
Geoffroy's bat	Myotis emarginatus	Europe	<10-985
Gray bat	Myotis grisescens	Southeastern U.S.	100,000+
Hodgson's bat	Myotis formosus	Asia	82-200
Eastern small-footed bat	Myotis leibii	Eastern U.S., Canada	≤22
Greater mouse-eared bat	Myotis myotis	Europe	50-800
Cave myotis	Myotis velifer	Southwest U.S., Mexico	100-3,000
Yuma myotis	Myotis yumanensis	Western U.S.	100-1,000
Arizona myotis	Myotis occultus	Southwestern U.S.	67
Daubenton's bat	Myotis daubentonii	Europe, Asia	6-144
Long-eared myotis	Myotis evotis	Canada, Western U.S.	4
Tricolored bat	Perimyotis subflavus	Eastern U.S.	9-40
Parti-coloured bat	Vespertilio murinus	Europe, Asia	>30
Big brown bat	Eptesicus fuscus	North America, Central America, the Caribbean	20-100
Serotine bat	Eptesicus serotinus	Europe, Asia	5-200
Northern bat	Eptesicus nilsonii	Europe, Asia	10-70
Silver-haired bat	Lasionycteris noctivagans	Bermuda, Canada, Mexico, U.S.	8
Townsend's big-eared bat	Corynorhinus townsendii	Canada, Mexico, U.S.	40-55
Virginia big-eared bat	Corynorhinus townsendii virginianus	Appalachian U.S.	100-6335
Ozark big-eared bat	Corynorhinus townsendii ingens	AR, OK, MO	55-309
Rafinesque's big-eared bat	Corynorhinus rafinesquii	Southeastern U.S.	≤118
Common noctule	Nyctalus noctula	Europe, Asia, North Africa	20-50
Common pipistrelle	Pipistrellus pipistrellus	Europe, North Africa, Asia	92-262
Nathusius's pipistrelle	Pipistrellus nathusii	Europe	5-150
Evening bat	Nycticeius humeralis	Eastern U.S.	≤492
Gould's wattled bat	Chalinolobus gouldii	Australia	20-30
Southern forest bat	Vespadelus regulus	Australia	<25
Lesser long-eared bat	Nyctophilus geoffroyi	Australia	3-23
Pallid bat	Antrozous pallidus	Canada, Western U.S., Mexico	10-150
Barbastelle	Barbastella barbastellus	Europe	10
Allen's big-eared bat	Plecotus phyllotis	Southwestern U.S., Mexico	18-97
Family: Rhinolophidae
Mehely's horseshoe bat	Rhinolophus mehelyi	Europe, Middle East	<60
Lesser horseshoe bat	Rhinolophus hipposideros	Europe, North Africa, Asia	2-750
Rufous horseshoe bat	Rhinolophus rouxii	Asia, Southeast Asia	50-60
Family: Molossidae
Mexican free-tailed bat	Tadarida brasiliensis	U.S., Central America, South America	≤15 million
Big free-tailed bat	Nyctinomops macrotis	North America, Central America, South America	≤2,000
Family: Phyllostomatidae
Geoffroy's tailless bat	Anoura geoffroyi	Central America, South America	<150
Family:Miniopteridae
Common bent-wing bat	Miniopterus schreibersii	Europe, Asia, Australia	2,500-5,000
Family: Pteripodidae
Bornean large flying fox	Pteropus vampyrus	Borneo	<15,000
