= List of mammals of Virginia =

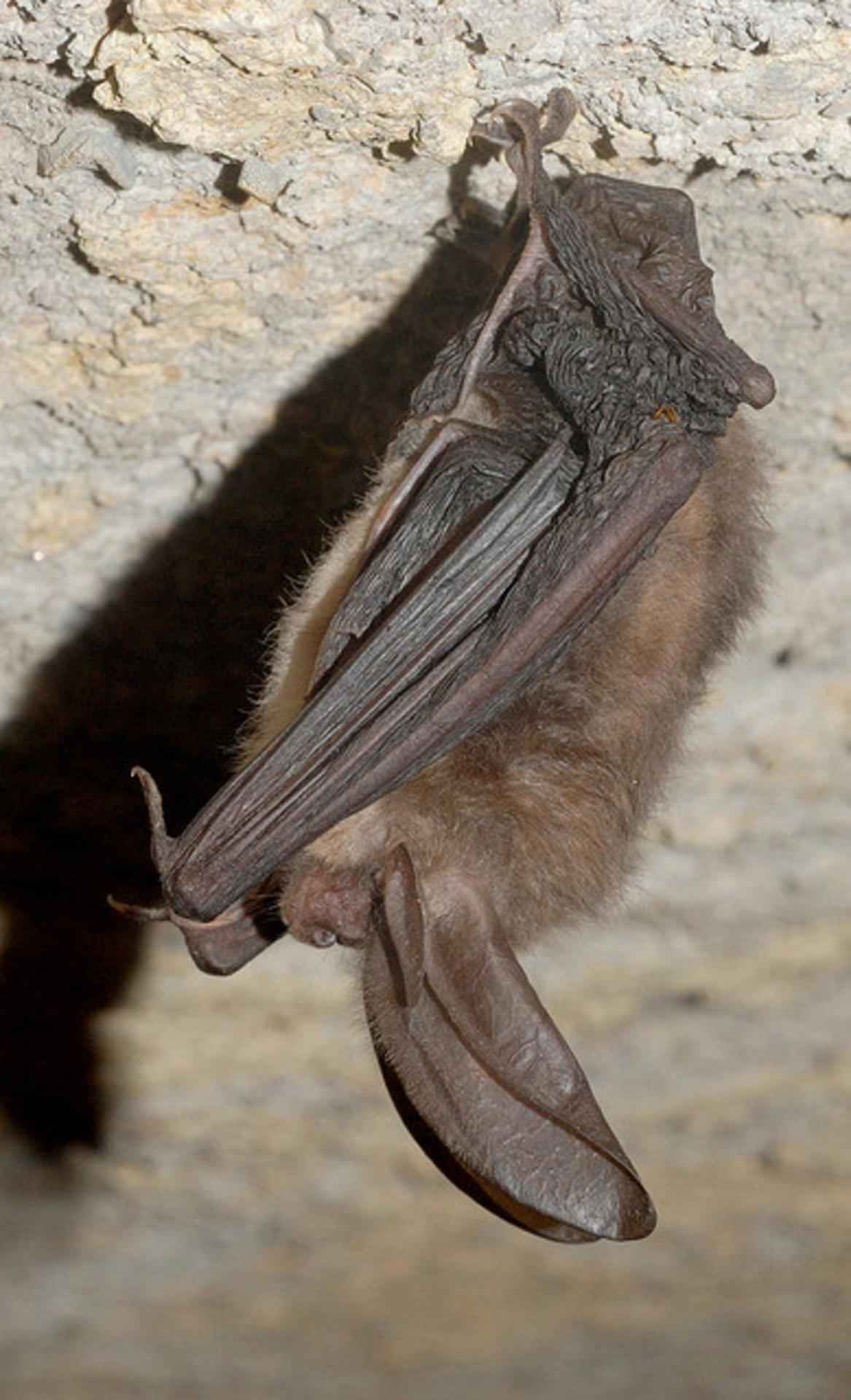
The Virginia big-eared bat (Corynorhinus townsendii virginianus) is the state mammal of Virginia

This is a list of mammals in Virginia, including both current and recently historical inhabitants. Virginia has 77 species of native land mammals (including extirpated species), and the coast is visited by nearly 30 marine mammal species. 11 species or subspecies of native Virginian mammals are listed as endangered or threatened by the state Department of Wildlife Resources (DWR). Species which are presumed extirpated are ~~crossed out~~.

== Didelphimorpha (opossums) ==
Name	Species	Family	Conservation status	
Name	Species	Family	IUCN Red List	State (NatureServe)
Virginia opossum	Didelphis virginiana	Didelphidae		Secure (S5)

== Rodentia (rodents) ==
Name	Species / subspecies	Family	Conservation status			
Name	Species / subspecies	Family	IUCN Red List	Federal (ESA)	State (Virginia DWR)	State (NatureServe)
American beaver	Castor canadensis	Castoridae				Secure (S5)
Southern red-backed vole	Clethrionomys gapperi	Cricetidae				Secure (S5)
Rock vole	Microtus chrotorrhinus	Cricetidae			State endangered	Critically imperiled (S1)
Meadow vole	Microtus pennsylvanicus	Cricetidae				Secure (S5)
Woodland vole	Microtus pinetorum	Cricetidae				Secure (S5)
Allegheny woodrat	Neotoma magister	Cricetidae				Vulnerable (S3)
Golden mouse	Ochrotomys nuttalli	Cricetidae				Apparently secure (S4)
Muskrat	Ondatra zibethicus	Cricetidae				Secure (S5)
Marsh rice rat	Oryzomys palustris	Cricetidae				Secure (S5)
Cotton mouse	Peromyscus gossypinus	Cricetidae				Vulnerable (S3)
White-footed mouse	Peromyscus leucopus	Cricetidae				Secure (S5)
Eastern deer mouse	Peromyscus maniculatus	Cricetidae				Secure (S5)
Eastern harvest mouse	Reithrodontomys humulis	Cricetidae				Secure (S5)
Hispid cotton rat	Sigmodon hispidus	Cricetidae				Secure (S5)
Southern bog lemming	Synaptomys cooperi	Cricetidae				Secure (S5)
Nutria	Myocastor coypus	Echimyidae				SNA - introduced
North American porcupine	Erethizon dorsatum	Erethizontidae				Critically imperiled (S1)
House mouse	Mus musculus	Muridae				SNA - introduced
Brown rat	Rattus norvegicus	Muridae				SNA - introduced
Black rat	Rattus rattus	Muridae				SNA - introduced
Carolina northern flying squirrel	Glaucomys sabrinus coloratus	Sciuridae		Endangered	State endangered	Critically imperiled (S1)
Virginia northern flying squirrel	Glaucomys sabrinus fuscus	Sciuridae				Critically imperiled (S1)
Southern flying squirrel	Glaucomys volans	Sciuridae				Secure (S5)
Woodchuck	Marmota monax	Sciuridae				Secure (S5)
Eastern gray squirrel	Sciurus carolinensis	Sciuridae				Secure (S5)
Eastern fox squirrel	Sciurus niger	Sciuridae				Apparently secure (S4)
Eastern chipmunk	Tamias striatus	Sciuridae				Secure (S5)
American red squirrel	Tamiasciurus hudsonicus	Sciuridae				Secure (S5)
Woodland jumping mouse	Napaeozapus insignis	Zapodidae				Secure (S5)
Meadow jumping mouse	Zapus hudsonius	Zapodidae				Secure (S5)

== Lagomorpha (lagomorphs) ==
Name	Species	Family	Conservation status		
Name	Species	Family	IUCN Red List	State (Virginia DWR)	State (NatureServe)
~~Snowshoe hare~~	~~Lepus americanus~~	Leporidae		State endangered	Presumed extirpated (SX)
Black-tailed jackrabbit	Lepus californicus	Leporidae			SNA - introduced
Eastern cottontail	Sylvilagus floridanus	Leporidae			Secure (S5)
Appalachian cottontail	Sylvilagus obscurus	Leporidae			Apparently secure (S4)
Marsh rabbit	Sylvilagus palustris	Leporidae			Vulnerable (S3)

== Eulipotyphla (shrews and moles) ==
Name	Species	Family	Conservation status		
Name	Species	Family	IUCN Red List	State (Virginia DWR)	State (NatureServe)
Northern short-tailed shrew	Blarina brevicauda	Soricidae			Secure (S5)
Southern short-tailed shrew	Blarina carolinensis	Soricidae			Secure (S5)
North American least shrew	Cryptotis parva	Soricidae			Secure (S5)
Cinereus shrew	Sorex cinereus	Soricidae			Secure (S5)
Long-tailed shrew	Sorex dispar	Soricidae			Vulnerable (S3)
Smoky shrew	Sorex fumeus	Soricidae			Secure (S5)
American pygmy shrew	Sorex hoyi	Soricidae			Apparently secure (S4)
Southeastern shrew	Sorex longirostris	Soricidae			Secure (S5)
American water shrew	Sorex palustris	Soricidae		State endangered	No status rank (NSR)
Star-nosed mole	Condylura cristata	Talpidae			Apparently secure (S4)
Hairy-tailed mole	Parascalops breweri	Talpidae			Secure (S5)
Eastern mole	Scalopus aquaticus	Talpidae			Secure (S5)

== Chiroptera (bats) ==
Name	Species / subspecies	Family	Conservation status			
Name	Species / subspecies	Family	IUCN Red List	Federal (ESA)	State (Virginia DWR)	State (NatureServe)
Rafinesque's big-eared bat	Corynorhinus rafinesquii	Vespertilionidae			State endangered	Imperiled (S2)
Virginia big-eared bat	Corynorhinus townsendii virginianus	Vespertilionidae		Endangered	State endangered	Critically imperiled (S1)
Big brown bat	Eptesicus fuscus	Vespertilionidae				Secure (S5)
Silver-haired bat	Lasionycteris noctivagans	Vespertilionidae				Apparently secure (S4)
Eastern red bat	Lasiurus borealis	Vespertilionidae				Apparently secure (S4)
Hoary bat	Lasiurus cinereus	Vespertilionidae				Vulnerable (S3)
Northern yellow bat	Lasiurus intermedius	Vespertilionidae				
Seminole bat	Lasiurus seminolus	Vespertilionidae				
Southeastern myotis	Myotis austroriparius	Vespertilionidae				Imperiled (S2)
Gray bat	Myotis grisescens	Vespertilionidae		Endangered	State endangered	Critically imperiled (S1)
Eastern small-footed myotis	Myotis leibii	Vespertilionidae				Imperiled (S2)
Little brown bat	Myotis lucifugus	Vespertilionidae			State endangered	Imperiled (S2)
Northern long-eared bat	Myotis septentrionalis	Vespertilionidae		Endangered	State threatened	Imperiled (S2)
Indiana bat	Myotis sodalis	Vespertilionidae		Endangered	State endangered	Critically imperiled (S1)
Evening bat	Nycticeius humeralis	Vespertilionidae				Apparently secure (S4)
Tricolored bat	Perimyotis subflavus	Vespertilionidae			State endangered	Imperiled (S2)
Mexican free-tailed bat	Tadarida brasiliensis	Vespertilionidae				

== Carnivora (carnivorans) ==
Name	Species	Family	Conservation status		
Name	Species	Family	IUCN Red List	Federal (ESA)	State (NatureServe)
Coyote	Canis latrans	Canidae			Secure (S5)
~~Gray wolf~~	~~Canis lupus~~	Canidae		Endangered	Presumed extirpated (SX)
~~Red wolf~~	~~Canis rufus~~	Canidae		Endangered	Presumed extirpated (SX)
Gray fox	Urocyon cinereoargenteus	Canidae			Secure (S5)
Red fox	Vulpes vulpes	Canidae			Secure (S5)
Bobcat	Lynx rufus	Felidae			Apparently secure (S4)
~~Cougar~~	~~Puma concolor~~	Felidae			Presumed extirpated (SX)
Striped skunk	Mephitis mephitis	Mephitidae			Secure (S5)
Eastern spotted skunk	Spilogale putorius	Mephitidae			Vulnerable (S3)
North American river otter	Lontra canadensis	Mustelidae			Apparently secure (S4)
Least weasel	Mustela nivalis	Mustelidae			Vulnerable (S3)
Long-tailed weasel	Neogale frenata	Mustelidae			Secure (S5)
American mink	Neogale vison	Mustelidae			Secure (S5)
Fisher	Pekania pennanti	Mustelidae		Endangered	Critically imperiled (S1)
Harbor seal	Phoca vitulina	Phocidae			
Common raccoon	Procyon lotor	Procyonidae			Secure (S5)
American black bear	Ursus americanus	Ursidae			Apparently secure (S4)

== Artiodactyla (even-toed ungulates) ==
Name	Species	Family	Conservation status	
Name	Species	Family	IUCN Red List	State (NatureServe)
~~American bison~~	~~Bison bison~~	Bovidae		Presumed extirpated (SX)
Elk	Cervus canadensis	Cervidae		Reintroduced
Sika deer	Cervus nippon	Cervidae		SNA - introduced
White-tailed deer	Odocoileus virginianus	Cervidae		Secure (S5)
Wild boar	Sus scrofa	Suidae		SNA - introduced

== Cetacea (whales) ==
Name	Species	Family	Conservation status		
Name	Species	Family	IUCN Red List	Federal (ESA)	State (NatureServe)
North Atlantic right whale	Eubalaena glacialis	Balaenidae		Endangered	
Common minke whale	Balaenoptera acutorostrata	Balaenopteridae			
Sei whale	Balaenoptera borealis	Balaenopteridae		Endangered	
Bryde's whale	Balaenoptera brydei	Balaenopteridae			
Blue whale	Balaenoptera musculus	Balaenopteridae		Endangered	
Fin whale	Balaenoptera physalus	Balaenopteridae		Endangered	
Humpback whale	Megaptera novaeangliae	Balaenopteridae			Critically imperiled (S1)
Common dolphin	Delphinus delphis	Delphinidae			
Short-finned pilot whale	Globicephala macrorhynchus	Delphinidae			
Long-finned pilot whale	Globicephala melas	Delphinidae			
Risso's dolphin	Grampus griseus	Delphinidae			
Atlantic white-sided dolphin	Lagenorhynchus acutus	Delphinidae			
Orca	Orcinus orca	Delphinidae			
False killer whale	Pseudorca crassidens	Delphinidae			
Striped dolphin	Stenella coeruleoalba	Delphinidae			
Atlantic spotted dolphin	Stenella frontalis	Delphinidae			
Spinner dolphin	Stenella longirostris	Delphinidae			
Rough-toothed dolphin	Steno bredanensis	Delphinidae			
Common bottlenose dolphin	Tursiops truncatus	Delphinidae			
Pygmy sperm whale	Kogia breviceps	Kogiidae			
Dwarf sperm whale	Kogia simus	Kogiidae			
Harbor porpoise	Phocoena phocoena	Phocoenidae			
Sperm whale	Physeter macrocephalus	Physeteridae		Endangered	
Dense-beaked whale	Mesoplodon densirostrus	Ziphiidae			
Antillean beaked whale	Mesoplodon europaeus	Ziphiidae			
True's beaked whale	Mesoplodon mirus	Ziphiidae			
Goose-beaked whale	Ziphias cavirostris	Ziphiidae			

== Sirenia (manatees) ==
Name	Species	Family	Conservation status	
Name	Species	Family	IUCN Red List	Federal (ESA)
West Indian manatee	Trichechus manatus	Trichechidae		Threatened
