= List of mammals of Indiana =

This is a list of mammals in Indiana. A total of 60 species are listed. Species currently extirpated in the state include the black bear, gray wolf, elk, American marten, cougar, fisher, porcupine, and bison.

The following tags are used to highlight each species' conservation status as assessed by the International Union for Conservation of Nature:

EX	Extinct	No reasonable doubt that the last individual has died.
EW	Extinct in the wild	Known only to survive in captivity or as a naturalized populations well outside its previous range.
CR	Critically endangered	The species is in imminent risk of extinction in the wild.
EN	Endangered	The species is facing an extremely high risk of extinction in the wild.
VU	Vulnerable	The species is facing a high risk of extinction in the wild.
NT	Near threatened	The species does not meet any of the criteria that would categorize it as risking extinction but it is likely to do so in the future.
LC	Least concern	There are no current identifiable risks to the species.
DD	Data deficient	There is inadequate information to make an assessment of the risks to this species.

== Opossums ==
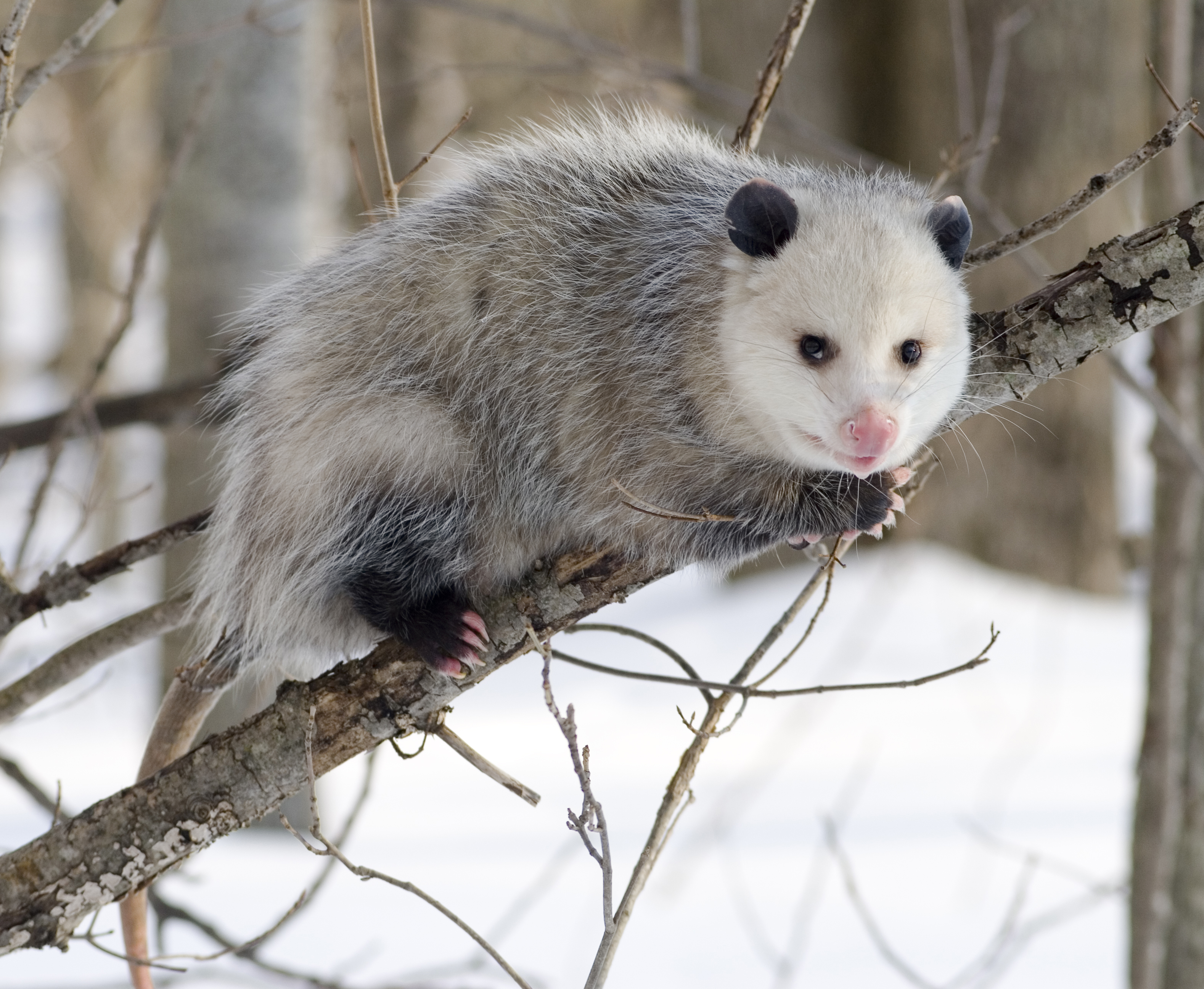
Virginia opossum

- Family Didelphidae (opossums)
  - Subfamily: Didelphinae
    - Genus: Didelphis
      - Virginia opossum, D. virginiana LC

== Armadillos ==
- Family Dasypodidae (armadillos)
  - Genus: Dasypus
    - Mexican long-nosed armadillo, D. mexicanus LC

== Insectivores ==
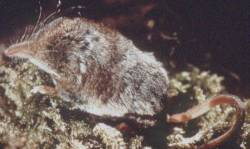
Masked shrew

Eulipotyphlans are insectivorous mammals. Shrews closely resemble mice, while moles are stout-bodied burrowers.

- Family Soricidae (shrews)
  - Genus: Blarina
    - Northern short-tailed shrew, B. brevicauda LC
  - Genus: Cryptotis
    - North American least shrew, C. parva LC
  - Genus: Sorex
    - Masked shrew, S. cinereus LC
    - Pygmy shrew, S. hoyi LC
    - Smoky shrew, S. fumeus LC
    - Southeastern shrew S. longirostris LC
- Family Talpidae (moles)
  - Genus: Scalopus
    - Eastern mole, S. aquaticus LC

== Rodents ==
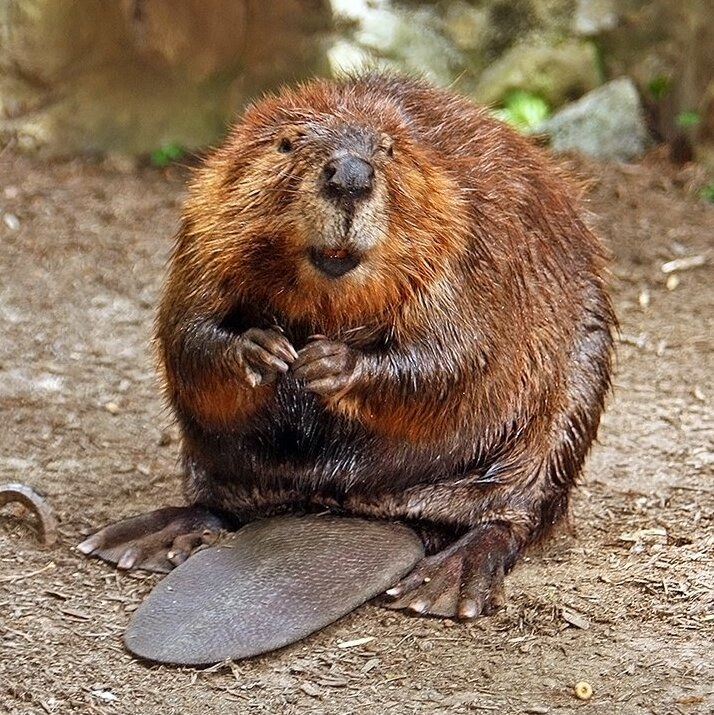
American beaver

- Family Castoridae (beavers)
  - Genus: Castor
    - North American beaver, C. canadensis LC
- Family Cricetidae (New World mice, rats, voles, lemmings, muskrats)
  - Genus: Microtus
    - Prairie vole, M. ochrogaster LC
    - Meadow vole, M. pennsylvanicus LC
    - Woodland vole, M. pinetorum LC
  - Genus: Oryzomys
    - Marsh rice rat, O. palustris LC
  - Genus: Neotoma
    - Allegheny woodrat, N. floridana LC
  - Genus: Ondatra
    - Muskrat, O. zibethicus LC
  - Genus: Reithrodontomys
    - Western harvest mouse, R. megalotis LC
  - Genus: Synaptomys
    - Southern bog lemming, S. cooperi LC
- Family Dipodidae (jumping mice)
  - Genus: Zapus
    - Meadow jumping mouse, Z. hudsonius LC
- Family Erethizontidae (New World porcupines)
  - Genus: Erethizon
    - North American porcupine, E. dorsatum LC extirpated
- Family Muridae (Old World mice and rats)
  - Genus: Mus
    - House mouse, M. musculus LC introduced
  - Genus: Rattus
    - Brown rat, R. norvegicus LC introduced
- Family Sciuridae (squirrels)
  - Genus: Glaucomys
    - Southern flying squirrel, G. volans LC
  - Genus: Marmota
    - Groundhog, M. monax LC
  - Genus: Sciurus
    - Eastern gray squirrel, S. carolinensis LC
    - Fox squirrel, S. niger LC
  - Genus: Poliocitellus
    - Franklin's ground squirrel, P. franklinii LC
  - Genus: Tamiasciurus
    - American red squirrel, T. hudsonicus LC
  - Genus: Ictidomys
    - Thirteen-lined ground squirrel, I. tridecemlineatus LC
  - Genus: Tamias
    - Eastern chipmunk, T. striatus LC
- Family Geomyidae (pocket gophers)
  - Genus: Geomys
    - Plains pocket gopher, G. bursarius LC

== Lagomorphs ==
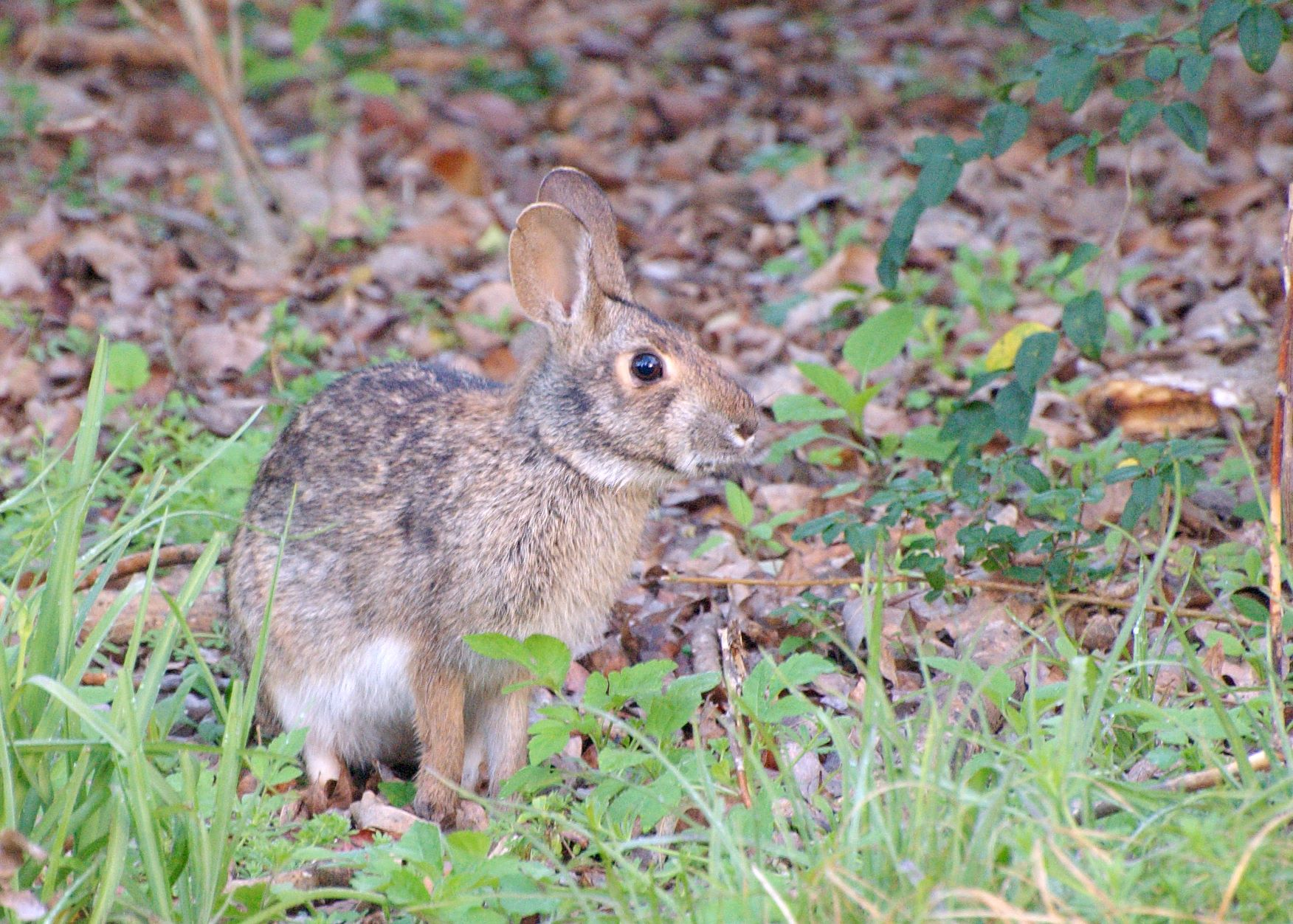
Swamp rabbit

- Family Lagomorpha (rabbits, hares and pikas)
  - Genus: Sylvilagus
    - Swamp rabbit, S. aquaticus LC
    - Eastern cottontail, S. floridanus LC

== Bats ==
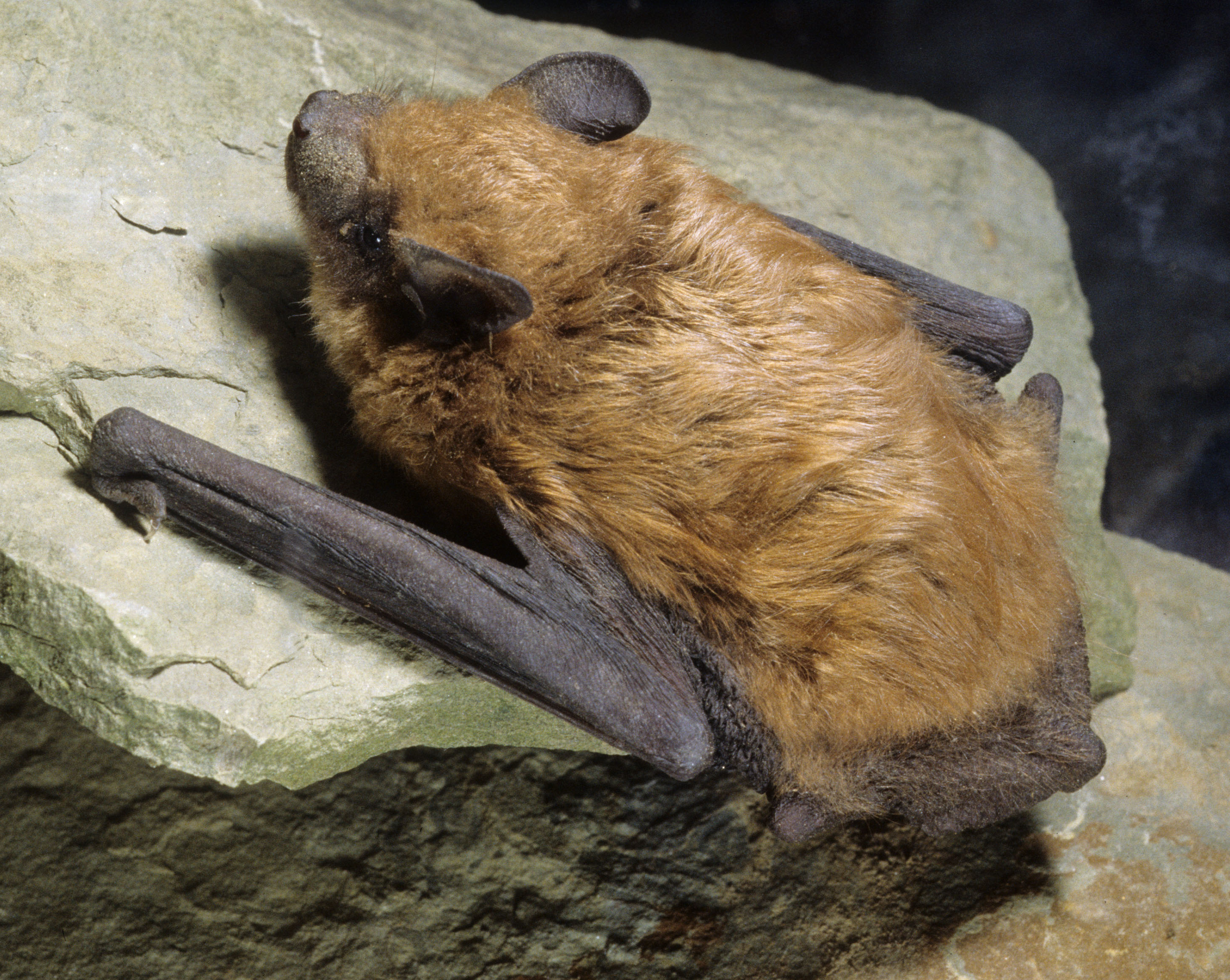
Big brown bat

- Family Vespertilionidae (vesper bats)
  - Genus: Corynorhinus
    - Rafinesque's big-eared bat, C. rafinesquii LC
  - Genus: Eptesicus
    - Big brown bat, E. fuscus LC
  - Genus: Lasionycteris
    - Silver-haired bat, L. noctivagans LC
  - Genus: Lasiurus
    - Eastern red bat, L. borealis LC
    - Hoary bat, L. cinereus LC
  - Genus: Myotis
    - Southeastern myotis, M. austroriparius LC
    - Gray bat, M. grisescens VU
    - Eastern small-footed myotis, M. leibii EN
    - Little brown bat, M. lucifugus EN
    - Northern long-eared bat, M. septentrionalis NT
    - Indiana bat, M. sodalis NT
  - Genus: Nycticeius
    - Evening bat, N. humeralis LC
  - Genus: Perimyotis
    - Tricolored bat, P. subflavus VU

== Carnivores ==
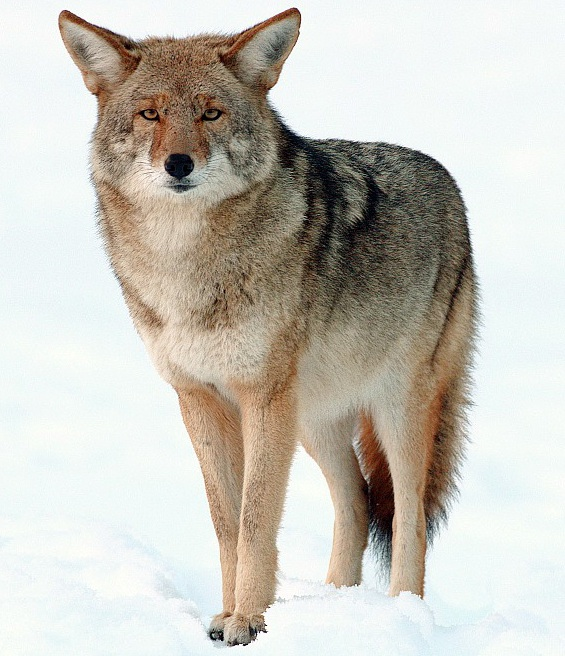
Coyote

- Family Canidae (canids)
  - Genus: Canis
    - Coyote, C. latrans LC
    - Gray wolf, C. lupus LC extirpated
    - Red wolf, C. rufus CR extirpated
  - Genus: Urocyon
    - Gray fox, U. cinereoargenteus LC
  - Genus: Vulpes
    - Red fox, V. vulpes LC
- Family Procyonidae (raccoons)
  - Genus: Procyon
    - Common raccoon, P. lotor LC
- Family Ursidae (bears)
  - Genus: Ursus
    - American black bear, U. americanus LC extirpated
- Family Felidae (cats)
  - Genus: Lynx
    - Bobcat, L. rufus LC
  - Genus: Puma
    - Cougar, P. concolor LC extirpated
- Family Mustelidae (weasels, minks, martens, fishers, and otters)
  - Genus: Lontra
    - North American river otter, L. canadensis LC
  - Genus: Martes
    - American marten, M. americana LC extirpated
  - Genus: Mustela
    - Least weasel, M. nivalis LC
  - Genus: Neogale
    - Long-tailed weasel, N. frenata LC
    - American mink, N. vison LC
  - Genus: Pekania
    - Fisher, P. pennanti LC extirpated
  - Genus: Taxidea
    - American badger, T. taxus LC
- Family Mephitidae (skunks)
  - Genus: Mephitis
    - Striped skunk, M. mephitis LC

== Even-toed ungulates ==
- Family Cervidae (deer)
  - Genus: Cervus
    - Elk, C. canadensis LC extirpated
    - Sika deer, C. nippon LC introduced
  - Genus: Odocoileus
    - White-tailed deer, O. virginianus LC
- Family Bovidae (bovids)
  - Genus: Bison
    - American bison, B. bison NT extirpated

== See also ==
- Lists of mammals by region
- List of U.S. state mammals
- List of birds of Indiana
