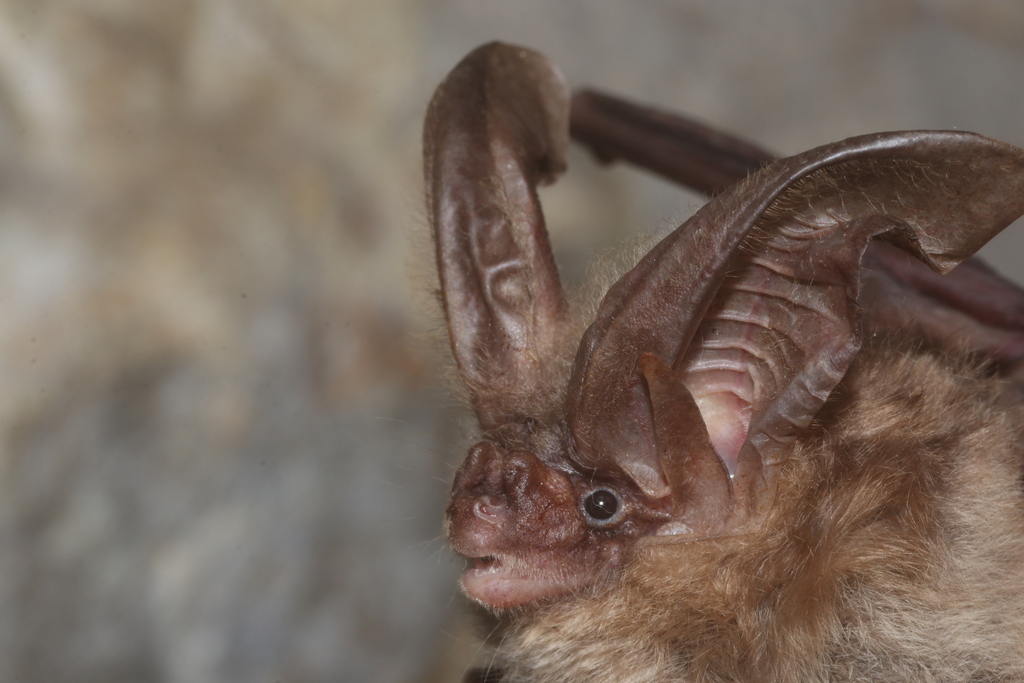

Scientific classification
- Kingdom: Animalia
- Phylum: Chordata
- Class: Mammalia
- Order: Chiroptera
- Family: Vespertilionidae
- Genus: Corynorhinus
- Species: C. leonpaniaguae

Binomial name
- Corynorhinus leonpaniaguae López-Cuamatzi, Ortega, Ospina-Garcés, Zúñiga, & MacSwiney G., 2024

= Leon Paniagua's big-eared bat =

Species of bat

Leon Paniagua's big-eared bat (Corynorhinus leonpaniaguae) is a species of vesper bat endemic to northeastern Mexico.

== Taxonomy ==
This species belongs to the family Vespertilionidae in the genus Corynorhinus and the species was previously classified under Corynorhinus mexicanus. However, recent molecular and morphological analyses have shown it to be a distinct species. It was named in honor of Dr. Livia León Paniagua, a prominent Mexican biologist, for her contributions to Mexican mammal systematics and natural history.

== Description ==
Like other members of its genus, Corynorhinus leonpaniaguae is characterized by its exceptionally large ears relative to body size, which range from 27.13–31.30 mm (1.068–1.232 in) in length, and two lump-like projections on the nose. It has a reduced forearm length of 38.71–43.96 mm (1.524–1.731 in) compared to Corynorhinus townsendii and a lesser number of interfemoral lines near the tail (eight or fewer), while C. townsendii has ten or more. Its mandibular characteristics may be associated with a diet of tougher insects.

== Distribution and habitat ==
Corynorhinus leonpaniaguae is found in the states of Nuevo León, Coahuila and Tamaulipas in northeastern Mexico. It inhabits the northern Sierra Madre Oriental and mountains in the northern state of Coahuila. This species is found in high-elevation between 300–2,000 metres (980–6,560 feet) above sea level, in open pine forests. Its specimens were found roosting inside abandoned mines and caves.

== Ecology ==
There is very little information about the ecology and natural history of Corynorhinus leonpaniaguae. Expeditions in 2021-2022 at its type locality at El Hundido Cave captured Corynorhinus leonpaniaguae with Myotis thysanodes, Corynorhinus townsendii, Leptonycteris nivalis, Idionycteris phyllotis and Antrozous pallidus. M. thysanodes and C. townsendii were consistently found with C. leonpaniaguae, implying that these three species likely share the cave as residents.

Cave captures of juveniles in August and captures of pregnant females in April suggest births late-April to mid-May and weaning in June–July, similar to C. mexicanus.

== See also ==
- List of living mammal species described in the 2020s
