= Molossus =

Molossus may refer to:

- Molossus (bat), genus of bats
  - "Molossus," a track from the Batman Begins soundtrack, named for the bat
- Molossus (son of Neoptolemus), in Greek mythology, the son of Neoptolemus and Andromache and ancestor of the Molossians
- Molossian hound, an extinct ancient breed of dog
  - Molossus of Epirus, a modern breed of dog
- Molossus (poetry), a metrical foot consisting of three long syllables
- Molossus, an Athenian commander on Euboea c. 350 BC

== See also ==
- Molasses
