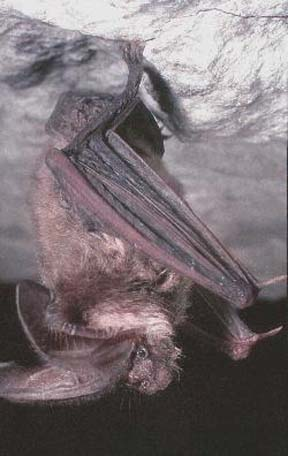
- An Ozark big-eared bat on a cave ceiling
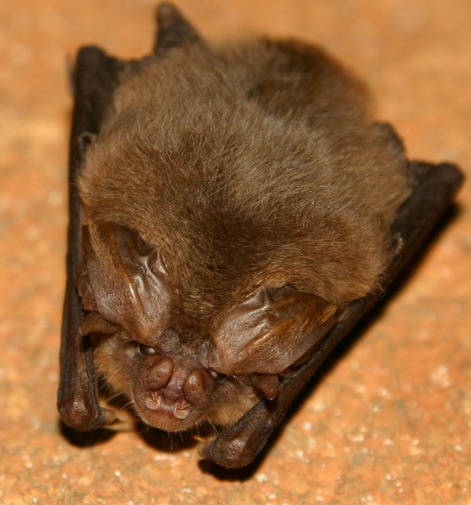
- Hibernating Ozark big-eared bat

Conservation status
- Critically Imperiled (NatureServe)

- Endangered (ESA)

Scientific classification
- Kingdom: Animalia
- Phylum: Chordata
- Class: Mammalia
- Order: Chiroptera
- Family: Vespertilionidae
- Genus: Corynorhinus
- Species: C. townsendii
- Subspecies: C. t. ingens

Trinomial name
- Corynorhinus townsendii ingens Handley, 1955

Synonyms
- Plecotus townsendii subsp. ingens (Handley, 1955)

= Ozark big-eared bat =

Subspecies of bat

The Ozark big-eared bat (Corynorhinus townsendii ingens) is an endangered species found only in a small number of caves in Arkansas, Oklahoma and Missouri, the southern central United States. Also known as the western big-eared bat, the long-eared bat, and the lump-nosed bat, its appearance is defined by a pair of outsize ears and a lump-adorned nose.

The Ozark big-eared bat is the largest and reddest of the five subspecies of Corynorhinus townsendii, is medium-sized and weighs from 0.2 to 0.5 ounces. It has very large, 1-inch-long ears that connect at the base across the forehead. The snout has large, prominent lumps above the nostrils. These particular bats feed on moths and other insects; they forage along forest edges.

== Importance ==
A colony of big brown bats can eat 18 million cucumber beetles. The insectivorous food habits of bats play an important role in maintaining a balance among insect populations. Other species of bats, especially in temperate zones, are insectivorous and collectively consume large quantities of insects. Bat droppings or guano support entire ecosystems of unique organisms, including bacteria which are useful in detoxifying wastes, as well as producing gasohol (mixture of gasoline and alcohol) and certain antibiotics.

== Habitat ==
The caves used by Ozark big-eared bats are located in karst regions dominated by oak-hickory forests. Karst, a special type of landscape, is formed by the dissolution of soluble rocks, including limestone and dolomite. The temperature of hibernation caves ranges from 40 to 50 °F (4 to 10 °C). The Ozark big-eared bats use caves all year around, thus they are highly susceptible to extinction if their homes vary too greatly in temperature, are disturbed, or are destroyed. The Ozark big-eared bats once lived in caves in Missouri, Arkansas, and Oklahoma,. but they have apparently abandoned their Missouri habitat due to human encroachment and cave disturbance.

== Offspring ==
Maternity colonies are located in caves that range in temperature between 50 and 59 °F (10 and 15 °C). Big-eared bats mate in the fall and store their sperm during the wintertime and at the end of hibernation, pregnancy occurs. Further reinforcing their fragile state, Ozark big-eared bats give birth to a single offspring. Because of their low birth rate, these mammals can easily become over-exploited. Young bats grow quite rapidly and are capable of flight at three weeks, and by six weeks, they are weaned from the mother.

== Causes of decline ==
Concern about the conservation status of bats is developing, as many species of bats are increasingly affected by humans. Bats face multiple threats of pesticide poisoning, roost destruction and closure, habitat loss, diseases such as white nose syndrome, over-exploitation, and extermination as pests. Habitat fragmentation, a major concern, creates a disruption of extensive habitats into bat populations. The primary cause of decline is disturbance. When humans enter hibernation caves, they arouse the bats, whose metabolic rate increases. A single arousal can expend 10 to 30 days of fat reserve. This can result in death by starvation, because the bats have little extra fat reserve. Predation at the cave entrance by house cats, racoons, bobcats, and other animals has also caused significant mortality.

== Conservation efforts ==
The U.S. Fish and Wildlife Service has established the Sequoyah/Oklahoma Bat Caves National Wildlife Refuge. In other areas, cave entrances have been fenced—to keep humans and domestic animals out of the caves but to allow bats access.

== See also ==
- Bats of the United States
