= Ozark Plateau National Wildlife Refuge =

Nature preserve in Oklahoma, US

- IUCN category IV (habitat/species management area)
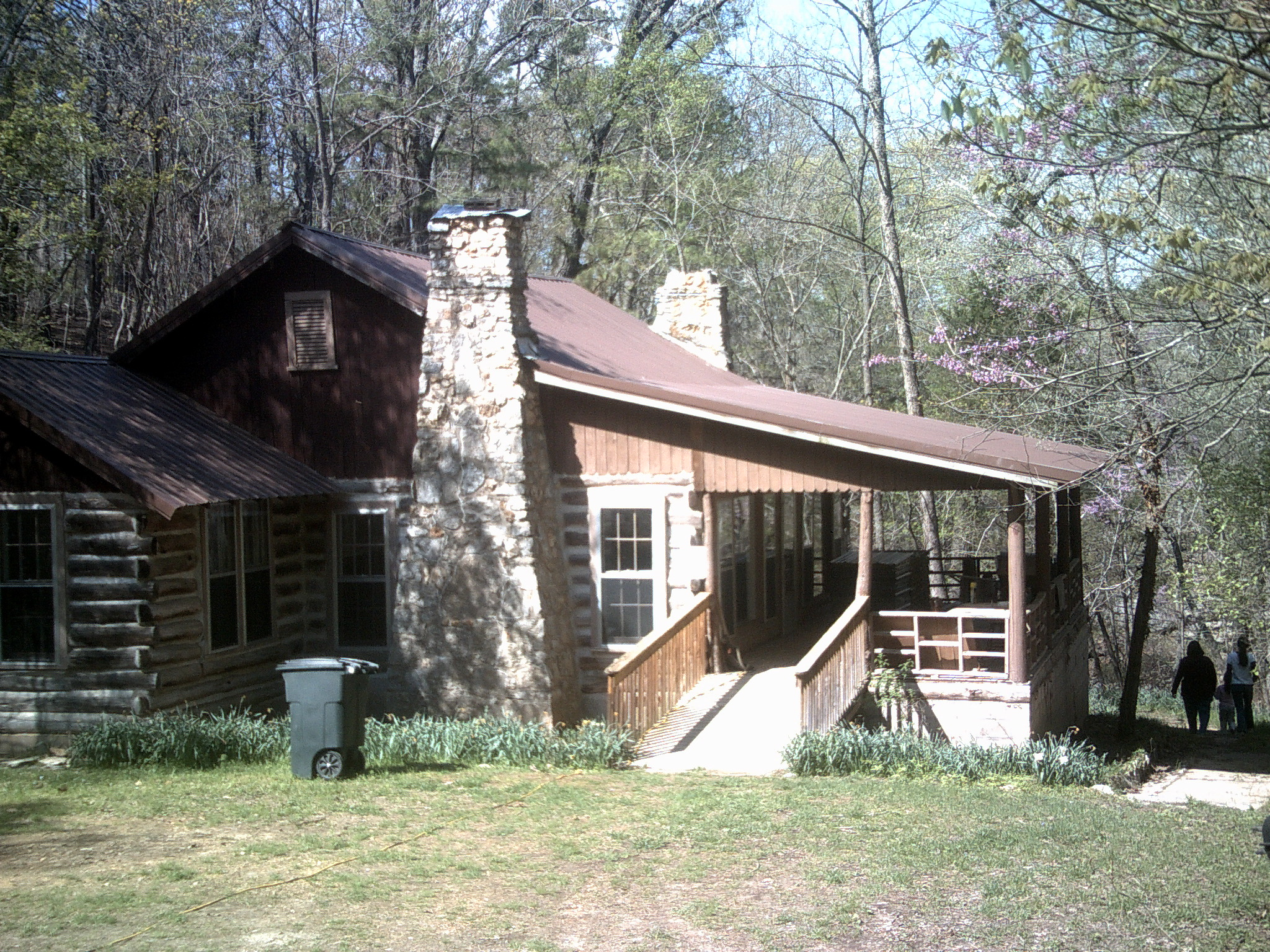
- The Mary and Murray Looney Education and Research Center on the Ozark Plateau National Wildlife refuge, near Colcord, Oklahoma.

- Location within the United States
- Location: Adair, Cherokee, Delaware, Ottawa counties, Oklahoma, United States
- Nearest city: Colcord, Oklahoma
- Coordinates: 36°19′05″N 94°42′36″W
- Area: 4,200 acres (17 km^{2})
- Established: 1986
- Governing body: U.S. Fish and Wildlife Service
- Website: Ozark Plateau National Wildlife Refuge

Originally known as the Oklahoma Bat Caves National Wildlife Refuge, Ozark Plateau National Wildlife Refuge was established for the protection of endangered bats and their habitat. The refuge is made up of several parcels of land located in northeastern Oklahoma. These parcels contain numerous caves considered crucial for the bats' survival.

The endangered cave species include the Ozark big-eared bat (Corynorhinus townsendii ingens), gray bat (Myotis grisescens), Indiana bat (Myotis sodalis), and Ozark cavefish (Amblyopsis rosae)

To protect the fragile habitats provided by the caves and the forests surrounding them, this refuge is currently closed to the general public.
