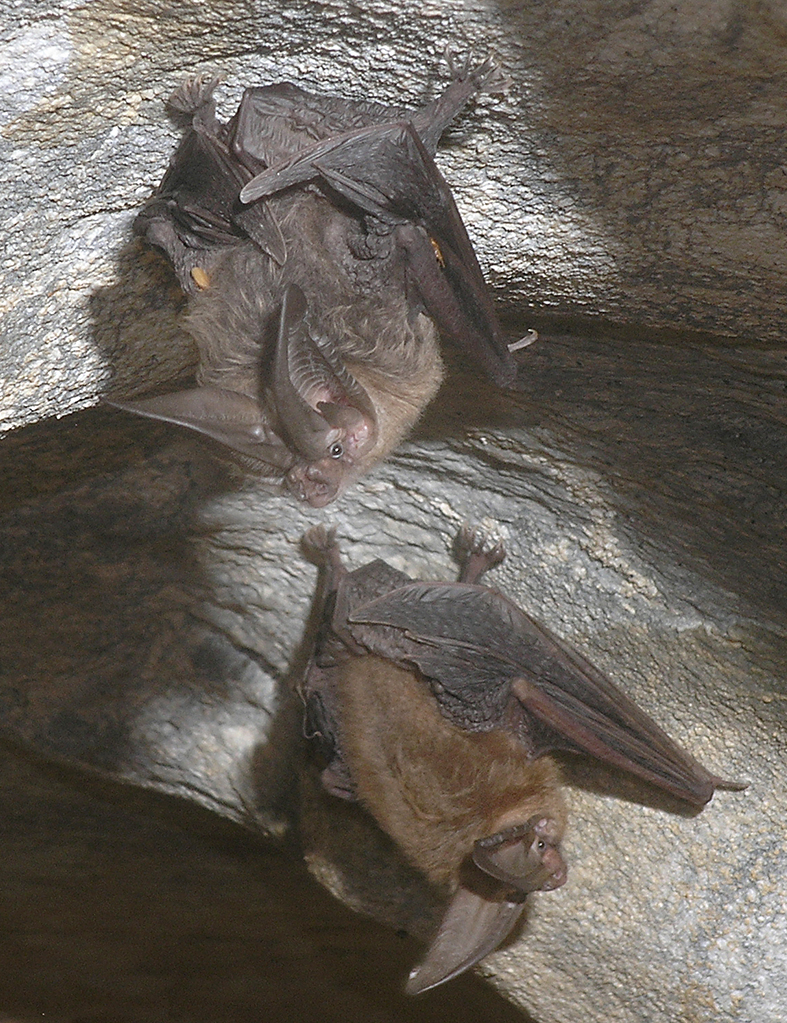

Conservation status
- Least Concern (IUCN 3.1)

Scientific classification
- Kingdom: Animalia
- Phylum: Chordata
- Class: Mammalia
- Order: Chiroptera
- Family: Vespertilionidae
- Genus: Corynorhinus
- Species: C. townsendii

Binomial name
- Corynorhinus townsendii Cooper, 1837

Subspecies
- See text

Synonyms
- Plecotus townsendii

= Townsend's big-eared bat =

Species of bat

Townsend's big-eared bat (Corynorhinus townsendii) is a species of vesper bat.

== Description ==
Townsend's big-eared bat is a medium-sized bat (7–12 g) with extremely long, flexible ears, and small yet noticeable lumps on each side of the snout. Its total length is around 10 cm (4 in.), its tail being around 5 cm (2 in) and its wingspan is about 28 cm (11 in).

The dental formula of Corynorhinus townsendii is 2.1.2.3.3.1.3.3. × 2 = 36

== Range ==
C. townsendii can be found in Canada, Mexico, and United States. Specifically, its main range is from southern British Columbia, down the Pacific Coast and into the Great Plains as well as Central Mexico. It also has two isolated populations in central and eastern parts of the United States respectively.

A notable colony of Townsend's is the colony currently residing on Santa Cruz Island, the area the species was originally described from and the only colony known in the Channel Islands. Originally there was a Santa Cruz colony of 300 bats known to reside in a historic ranch house, which was displaced in 1974 when the building was removed. Now there is a colony known to have resided in the Scorpion adobe building from before 1991 onwards. This colony is one of few coastal colonies known south of Point Conception.

== Ecology ==
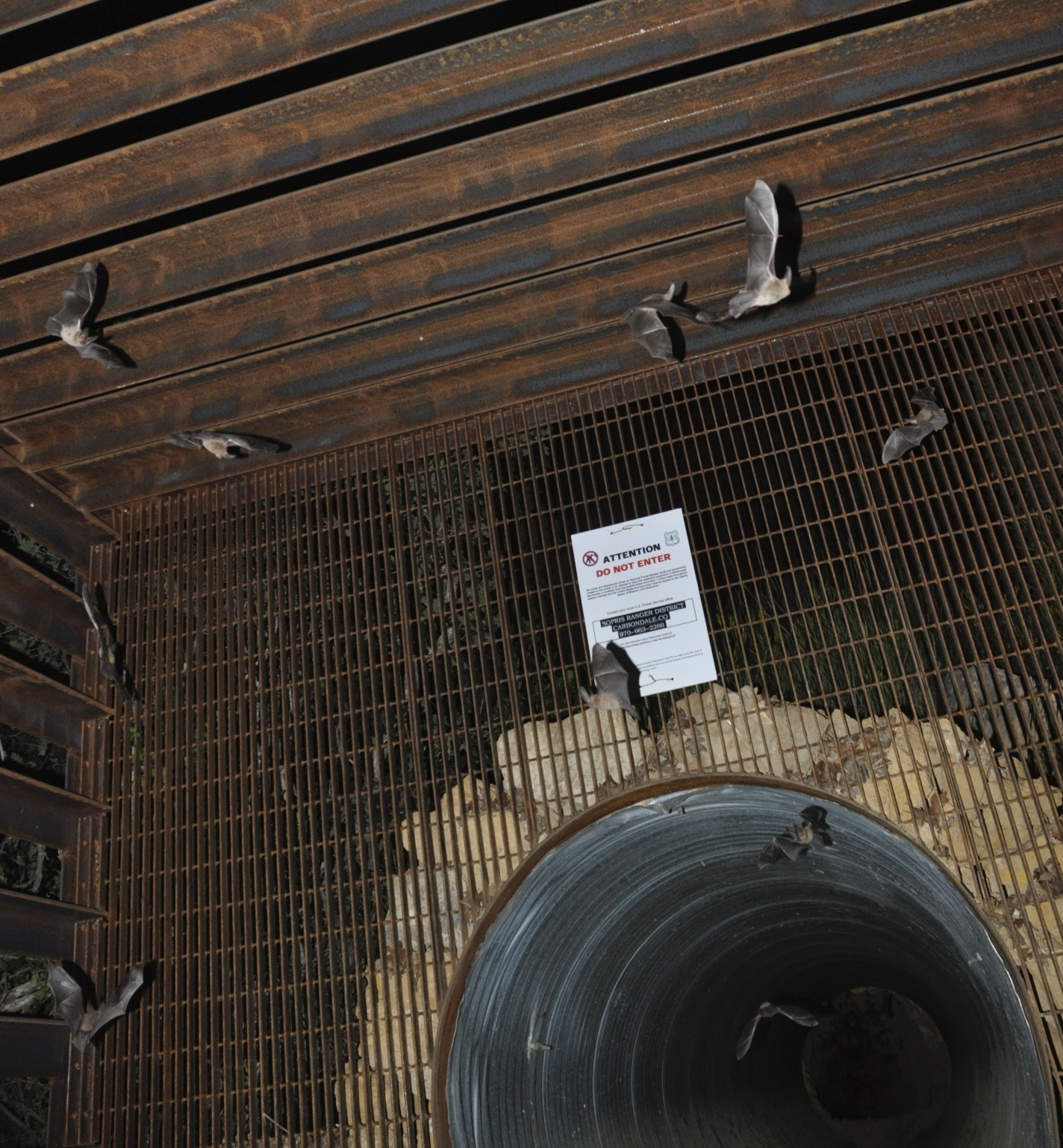
Townsend's big-eared bats exiting a maternity colony in a mine

The mating season for the Townsend's big-eared bat takes place in late fall. As with many other bat species, the female stores sperm in her reproductive tract after mating, and fertilization occurs in the spring. Gestation lasts from 50 to 60 days. As with other bat species, pups are born without the ability to fly. Only one pup is birthed per female. One study found the average lifespan of a Townsend's big-eared bat to be 16 years.

This bat requires large cavities for roosting; these may include abandoned buildings and mines, caves, and basal cavities of trees. During summer, these bats inhabit rocky crevices, caves, and derelict buildings. In winter, they hibernate in a variety of dwellings, including rocky crevices, caves, tunnels, mineshafts, spaces under loose tree bark, hollow trees, and buildings. During the summer, males and females occupy separate roosting sites; males are typically solitary, while females form maternity colonies, where they raise their pups. A maternity colony may range in size from 12 bats to 200, although in the eastern United States, colonies of 1,000 or more have been formed. During the winter, these bats hibernate, often when temperatures are around 32 to 53 °F (around 0 °C to 11.5 °C.) Townsend's roost singly during hibernation, forming small clusters only rarely. Males often hibernate in warmer places than females and are more easily aroused and active in winter than females. The bats are often interrupted from their sleep because they tend to wake up frequently and move around in the cave or move from one cave entirely to another. Before hibernation, C. townsendii individuals increase their body mass to compensate for the food they do not eat during the winter.

This species has 2–3 feeding periods between dark and dawn, with periods of rest in between. They rest in areas different from where they roost during the day.

During tests on straight-line courses, C. townsendii flew at speeds ranging from 2.9 to 5.5 m/s (6.4 to 12.3 mph).

== Diet and echolocation ==
This species is a moth specialist, and may feed almost exclusively on Lepidoptera. However, its diet may include small moths, flies, lacewings, dung beetles, sawflies, and other small insects. As a whisper bat, it echolocates at much lower intensities than other bats, and may be difficult to record using a bat detector. (This may be partly because it specializes on moths --- with some moths having the ability to hear bats, possibly producing their own noises to 'jam' a bat's echolocation in an effort to thwart predation.

== Functional morphology ==
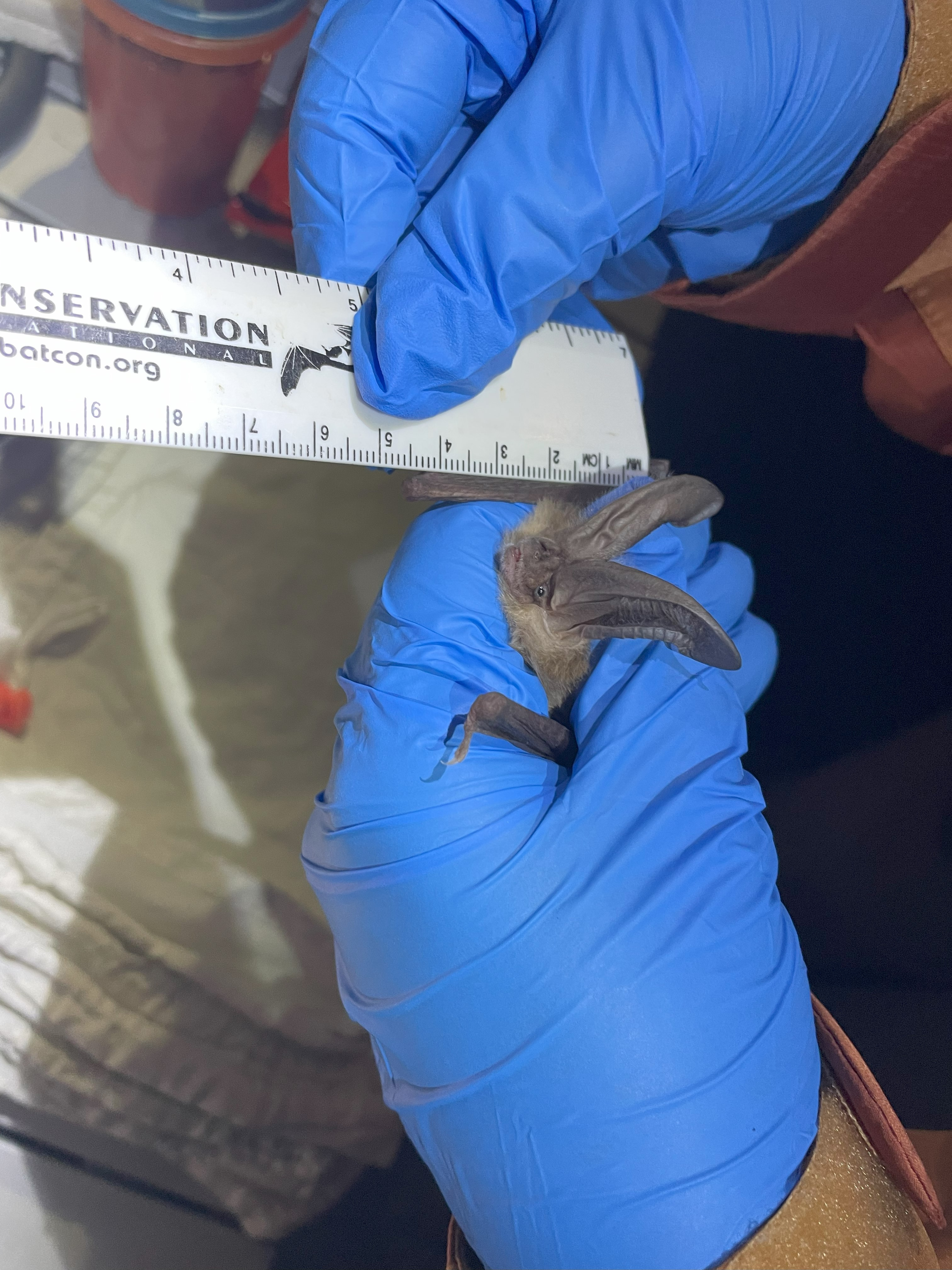
A Townsend's big-eared bat in hand

C. townsendii, as well as its close relative C. rafinesquii, both have low wing loading, which means a large wing area to mass ratio. This morphology allows for a large amount of lift, high maneuverability, low-speed flight, and hovering during flight.

Their large pinnae are usually in line with the body during flight; this indicates one of the roles of the pinnae is to impart lift during flight. The ears are also used to transmit sound into the bat's external auditory meatus, effectively distinguishing between ambient noise, and the sounds of predators or prey.

== Subspecies ==
Five subspecies are described:

- C. t. australis
- C. t. townsendii – Townsend's big-eared bat
- C. t. ingens – Ozark big-eared bat (federally endangered)
- C. t. pallescens – western big-eared bat
- C. t. virginianus – Virginia big-eared bat (federally endangered), the Virginia state bat

== See also ==
- Bats of the United States
- Bats of Canada
- Bats of Mexico
