= Batman Begins (soundtrack) =

2005 soundtrack album by Hans Zimmer and James Newton Howard

Batman Begins: Music from the Motion Picture

Film score by Hans Zimmer and James Newton Howard
- Released: June 14, 2005
- Recorded: December 26, 2004 – March 1, 2005
- Studios: AIR Studios, London
- Length: 60:26
- Label: Warner Sunset
- Producers: Hans Zimmer; James Newton Howard

Batman Begins: Music from the Motion Picture is the soundtrack album to Christopher Nolan's 2005 film Batman Begins. It was released on June 15, 2005. The soundtrack drew from the film score, composed and arranged by Hans Zimmer and James Newton Howard, as well as contributions by Ramin Djawadi, Lorne Balfe and Mel Wesson.

The main motif of the film (and later of the whole trilogy) consists of just two notes, played by horns and accompanied by strings, representing Batman's pain and guilt.

Batman's main action theme of the film (and later of the whole trilogy) is heard in the track "Molossus".

The score won an award at the ASCAP Film and Television Music Awards and it was nominated in the category "Best Score" at the Saturn Awards.

== Composition ==
Director Christopher Nolan originally invited Zimmer to compose the film score, and Zimmer asked the director if he could invite Howard to compose as well, as they had always planned a composers collaboration. The two composers collaborated on separate themes for the "split personality" of Bruce Wayne and his alter ego, Batman. Zimmer and Howard began composing in Los Angeles and moved to London where they stayed for 12 weeks to complete most of their writing. Zimmer and Howard sought inspiration for shaping the score by making set visits to Batman Begins.

Zimmer wanted to avoid composing a film score that had been done before, so the score became an amalgamation of orchestra and electronic music. The film's ninety-piece orchestra was developed from members of various London orchestras, and Zimmer chose to use more than the normal number of cellos. Zimmer enlisted a choir boy to help reflect the music in the film's scene where Bruce Wayne's parents are killed. Zimmer said: "He's singing a fairly pretty tune and then he gets stuck, it's like froze, arrested development". Zimmer also attempted to add human dimension to Batman, whose behavior would typically be seen as "psychotic", through the music. Both composers collaborated to create 2 hours and 20 minutes' worth of music for the film. Zimmer composed the action sequences, while Howard focused on the film's drama.

== Critical reception ==
Professional ratings
Review scores
Source	Rating
AllMusic	3.5/5 stars
Filmtracks	2/5 stars
Movie Music UK	4/5 stars
SoundtrackNet	4/5 stars

Reviews of the score were positive. Soundtrack.net, for example, in a review by Matt Scheller, said that "the music complements the visuals flawlessly". He called the main action track, Molossus, the best of the soundtrack. He does admit that the album is heavy on Hans Zimmer's style rather than James Newton Howard's ("I would say 70% Zimmer, 30% Howard"), and that "Hans Zimmer/Media Ventures haters should probably skip this album. His score in the end is four stars out of five".

Movie Music UK was equally positive—Jonathan Broxton claimed that "I personally found that there was a great deal of music in Batman Begins that is hugely enjoyable", specifically complimenting "Howard's exceptionally beautiful string elegy [...] during the opening moments of Eptesicus", a motif that recurs in "the achingly emotional Macrotus and Coryhorinus". He did admit that a lack of strong superhero themes and a complete lack of similarities to Danny Elfman's Batman scores, now considered classics, did make the score "unremittingly downbeat". He also rated the album four out of five.

Christian Clemmensen, sole reviewer of Filmtracks.com, was less ready to praise the score, saying that Zimmer and Howard's decision not to use Elfman's material was an attitude that "stinks of laziness". He also considers the theme used to represent Batman, a rising, two-note minor third, inadequate to represent the complex character of Bruce Wayne and his alter ego. Most of these complaints he lies on the shoulders of Zimmer, saying that "you could argue that Zimmer traded in his hoard of lesser-known ghostwriters for one top-notch ghostwriter [Howard]". His final rating is two stars out of five.

== Easter eggs ==
- The titles of each of the tracks are taken from the scientific names for different genera of bat.
- The titles of tracks 4 through 9 form an acrostic: Barbastella, Artibeus, Tadarida, Macrotus, Antrozous, and Nycteris all come together to spell "Batman".

== Use in other works ==
The soundtrack is also often sampled for other superhero-related productions. "Vespertilio" and "Eptesicus" were used in the screener pilot for Heroes. It has also been sampled in the song "Nacht" by German rapper Kollegah. "Myotis" has been featured in trailers for King Kong, Fantastic Four and Far Cry. "Molossus" was sampled for the Aquaman pilot, and was also used in the trailer for V for Vendetta and The Dark Knight as well as a few episodes of Top Gear. The beginning of "Vespertilio" and part of "Myotis" was also used for the previously mentioned V for Vendetta trailer.

== Track listing ==
All music is composed by Hans Zimmer and James Newton Howard.

No.	Title	Length
1.	"Vespertilio" (the opening logos, the flashback of the bats, the two-note motif played for the first time in the soundtrack and the journey to Ra's al Ghul's monastery)	2:52
2.	"Eptesicus" (the flashback of Bruce remembering his parents and the training sequence)	4:20
3.	"Myotis" (plays during the destruction of the monastery and when Bruce knows what he must do when he returns to Gotham)	5:46
4.	"Barbastella" (the death of the Waynes, and when Bruce sees the Bat and enters the cave as an adult, knowing his path)	4:45
5.	"Artibeus" (played during Batman's first appearance and when Ducard meets Bruce in the prison)	4:20
6.	"Tadarida" (when Batman has Rachel in the Batcave, when Scarecrow attacks Batman, and when the man at Wayne Enterprises tells Earle about the damaged ship and missing microwave emitter)	5:06
7.	"Macrotus" (the Wayne theme, flashback of Bruce going to the opera. Bruce in the Ninja test. Also plays during the flashback of Bruce meeting Rachel again and the courtroom with Joe Chill)	7:36
8.	"Antrozous" (Batman reveals himself to Dawes, flies to Ra's al Ghul and fights League of Shadows ninjas)	3:59
9.	"Nycteris" (played when Bruce meets Lucius Fox, sets his gadgets and when he has a moment with Rachel before she goes to Arkham)	4:26
10.	"Molossus" (the main action theme is played during the Tumbler escape chase to the Batcave; parts of it are also used when Batman goes after the train in the climax)	4:49
11.	"Corynorhinus" (the film's resolution; Bruce and Rachel meeting in the ruins of Wayne Manor and Gordon unveiling the Bat Signal to Batman; a modified version of the end also appears when Batman attacks Falcone and says "I'm Batman")	5:04
12.	"Lasiurus" (includes Ra's al Ghul teaching Bruce about criminals, Batman watching over Gotham after defeating Falcone)	7:27

Tracks not included within the release of the soundtrack:

- "Folletto!...Folletto" from Mefistofele

Written by Arrigo Boito. Performed by Norman Treigle. Ambrosian Opera Chorus & London Symphony Orchestra. Conducted by Julius Rudel. EMI Classics. EMI Film & Television Music

- "Happy Birthday To You"

Written by Mildred J. Hill & Patty S. Hill. Performed by Cavendish String Quartet

- "Divertimento In D"

Written by Wolfgang Amadeus Mozart. Performed by Cavendish String Quartet

== Chart positions ==
Chart (2005)	Peak position
U.S. Billboard 200	155
Top Soundtracks	8
