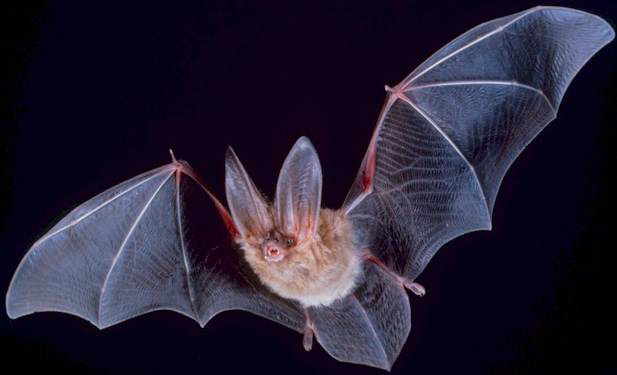
- Townsend's big-eared bat (Corynorhinus townsendii)

Scientific classification
- Kingdom: Animalia
- Phylum: Chordata
- Class: Mammalia
- Infraclass: Placentalia
- Order: Chiroptera
- Family: Vespertilionidae
- Tribe: Plecotini
- Genus: Corynorhinus; H. Allen, 1865

Type species
- Plecotus macrotis Le Conte, 1831

Species
- Corynorhinus rafinesquii Corynorhinus mexicanus Corynorhinus leonpaniaguae Corynorhinus townsendii

= Corynorhinus =

Genus of bats

The genus Corynorhinus consists of the big-eared bats, or American long-eared bats. Only four species occur in the genus, all occurring in North America. Members of this group were previously in the genus Plecotus, the long-eared bats, and were also then called lump-nosed bats. Populations of these species are generally uncommon and declining. Two subspecies, the Virginia big-eared bat (C. t. virginianus) and the Ozark big-eared bat (C. t. ingens) are federally endangered.

== Species ==
Corynorhinus species are:

- Corynorhinus rafinesquii Rafinesque's big-eared bat
- Corynorhinus mexicanus Mexican big-eared bat
- Corynorhinus leonpaniaguae Leon Paniagua's big-eared bat
- Corynorhinus townsendii Townsend's big-eared bat
  - C. t. ingens Ozark big-eared bat (endangered)
  - C. t. pallescens western big-eared bat
  - C. t. townsendii Townsend's big-eared bat
  - C. t. virginianus Virginia big-eared bat (endangered)

== Popular culture ==
Corynorhinus is one of the track listing names in the Batman Begins soundtrack by James Newton Howard and Hans Zimmer.
