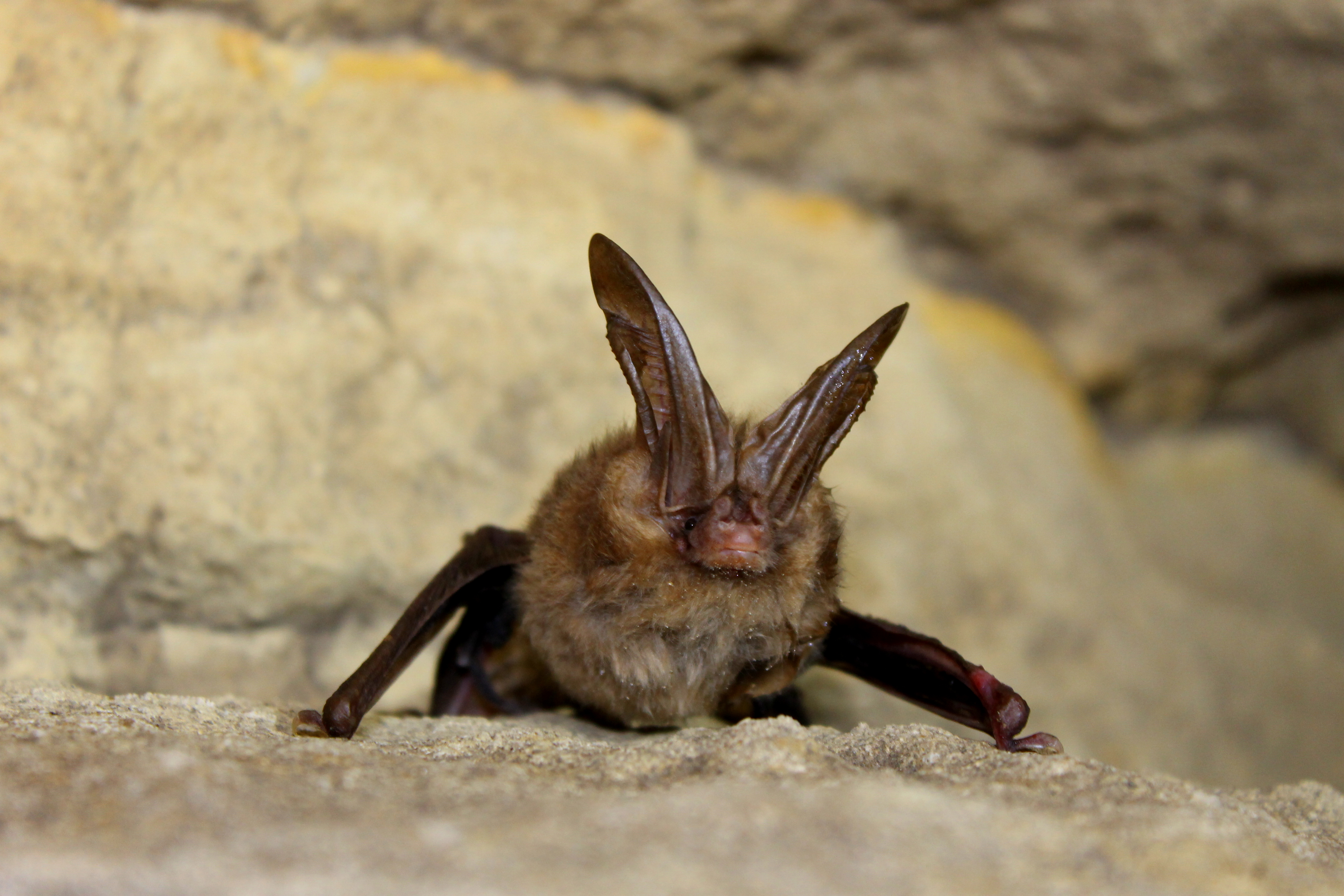
- Photo of a Virginia big-eared bat roosting at a large hibernaculum

Conservation status
- Apparently Secure (NatureServe)

- Endangered (ESA)

Scientific classification
- Kingdom: Animalia
- Phylum: Chordata
- Class: Mammalia
- Order: Chiroptera
- Family: Vespertilionidae
- Genus: Corynorhinus
- Species: C. townsendii
- Subspecies: C. t. virginianus

Trinomial name
- Corynorhinus townsendii virginianus Handley, 1955

= Virginia big-eared bat =

Subspecies of bat

The Virginia big-eared bat (Corynorhinus townsendii virginianus) is one of two endangered subspecies of the Townsend's big-eared bat. It is found in Virginia, West Virginia, North Carolina, and Kentucky. In 1979, the US Fish and Wildlife Service categorized this as an endangered species. There are about 20,000 left and most of them can be found in West Virginia. The Virginia big-eared bat is the state bat of Virginia.

== Taxonomy ==
The Virginia big-eared bat is classified as Corynorhinus townsendii virginianus. The Corynorhinus genus, called the North American big-eared bats, consists of three different species located from central Mexico to southwestern Canada (C. mexicanus, C. rafinesquii, C. townsendii). The subspecies of C. townsendii are C. t. townsendii, C. t. pallescens, C. t. australis, C. t. ingens, and C. t. virginianus, all of which primarily occupy North America. It is hypothesized that the MRCA (most recent common ancestor), of the Corynorhinus species diverged into two different lineages, creating a C. rafineesquii ancestor and C. mexicanus/C. townsendii ancestor during the warm periods of the Pliocene, approximately 5.0-2.5 mya. Then, during the cooling period of the early Pleistocene, 2.5 mya, the C. mexicanus/ C. townsendii lineage split, separating C. mexicanus and C. townsendii. During this same period, the C. townsendii species was further divided into three lineages, isolating a C. t. townsendii ancestor, a C. t. pallescens/C. t. australis ancestor, and a C. t. ingens/C. t. virginianus ancestor. Subsequent glacial advances around 1.8-1.0 mya finally divided all these lineages into the subspecies that are found today. The events that caused the subspeciation between C. t. ingens and C. t. virginianus are believed to have separated the already disjunct populations from each other, leading the then unified species towards separate refugia, leading to divergence and subsequent subspeciation.

== Description ==
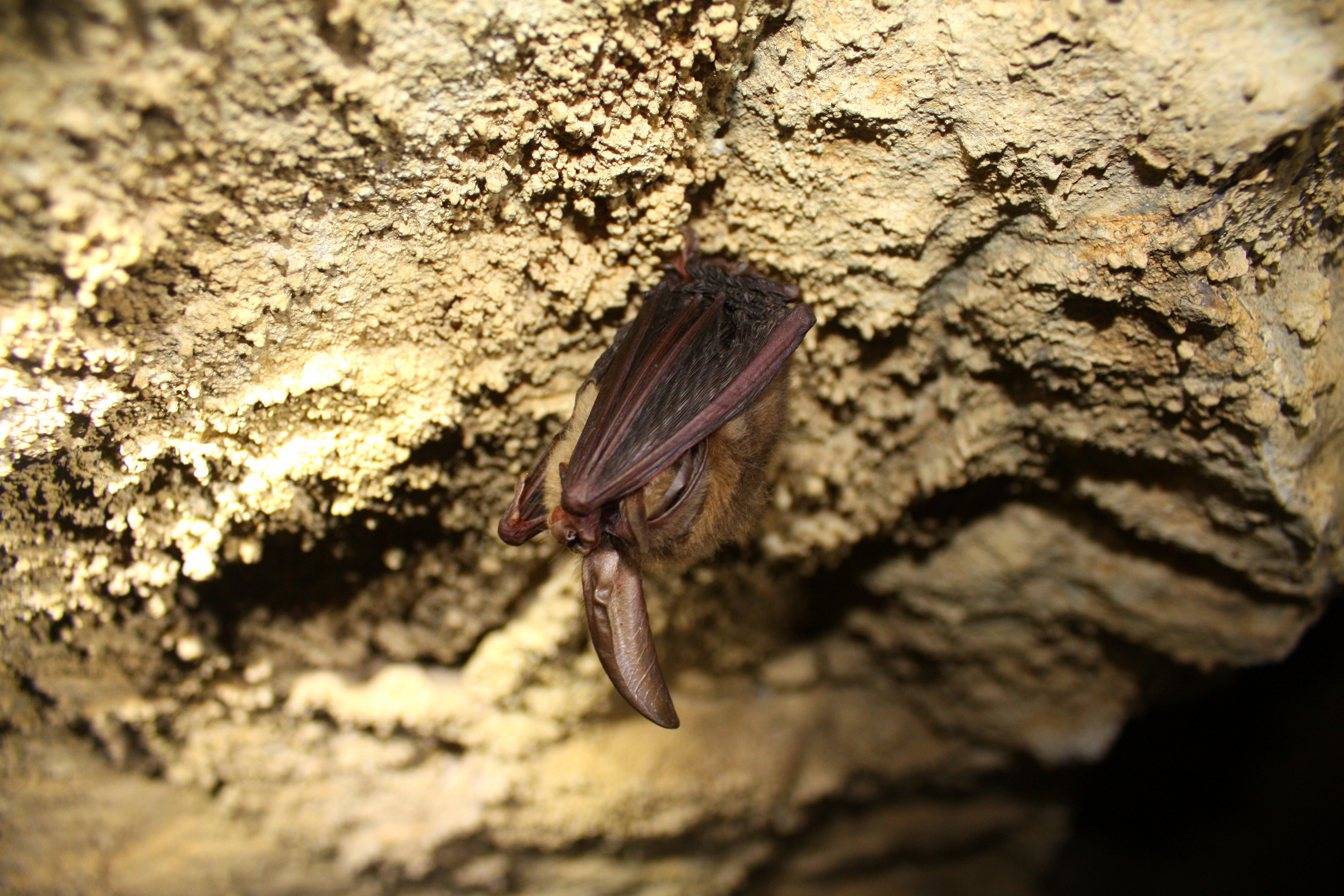
Perching in cave

The Virginia big-eared bat has light to dark brown fur depending on age. Their fur is long and soft and the same from its base to its tip. This species is one of the largest cave-dwelling bats in its range, and weighs between 7 and 12 grams. The bat is recognized by its big ears, which are over 2.5 centimeters long. Their ears reach back to half the length of their body when at rest. It also has a globular shaped muzzle and elongated nostrils. Its whole body is 98 millimeters long. The forearms of the bat are anything from 39 to 48 millimeters, the tail can be about 46 millimeters, and the hind foot can be about 11 millimeters.

Mating happens in the fall and the winter. Females ovulate in the winter and the spring and can store the sperm from the male until then. The bats are pregnant for 3 months and have their one pup in May or June. In 2 months the pups fully develop and are able to fly from their roost.

These bats live in caves throughout the whole year and prefer caves surrounded by oak-hickory forest. They are usually located in mountainous limestone regions. During the maternity period the female bats stay in the caves. Most male bats don't stay with the female bats during this period. They aren't migratory and usually stay close to their caves. In the winter this species hibernates rather than migrates. Usually these bats only leave to hunt for food. They are nocturnal hunters and feeders. In Virginia they are known to hunt in fields and in Kentucky they are known to hunt by cliffs. Research shows that hunting patterns are very varied. They use their sonar to see insects while flying on the edges of the forests where they hunt. They benefit us because they hunt harmful insects. They hunt for insects such as: small moths, beetles, flies, lacewings, bees and wasps.

Threats to this species include disturbance from noise, bright lights, and human presence.

== Diet ==
The Virginia big-eared bat consumes insects, with small moths making up a significant portion of the diet.

Virginia big-eared bats are insectivores. Insectivores are carnivores that predominantly eat insects. The Virginia big-eared bat has adapted to evening and dawn feeding times. They use this time to hunt airborne insects in wooded areas. Bats have a very strong sense of hearing, which allows them to quickly identify and catch their prey.

The bat's strong sense of hearing allows them to echolocate. Echolocation is a natural ability that bats have that allows them to make sounds that then echo off of objects around them, enabling them to find their prey while flying in the dark. Typically they prey on insects like moths, beetles, termites, mosquitoes and flies. Without echolocation, the bats would not be able to locate food.

When analyzed, 97% of Virginia big-eared bat fecal pellets showed that the bat had consumed and digested Lepidoptera. Lepidoptera is a classification of insects that contains butterflies and moths.

In Kentucky a similar study was done, examining the fecal pellets and stomach contents of the bats in and around the caves. The processed food showed that in this particular area the Virginia Big-Eared Bat had a diet of mainly Lepidoptera (moths) and Coleoptera (beetles), along with spiders, crickets, roaches, flies, ants, wasps and bees.

== Distribution and habitat ==
Virginia big-eared bats can be found in isolated populations located in eastern Kentucky, eastern West Virginia, southwestern Virginia, and northwestern North Carolina. They are nonmigratory bats, and live in caves all year round. This subspecies of Townsend's big-eared bats prefer caves made from limestone bedrock. The regions they are found in are usually filled with oak-hickory or beech-maple-hemlock forest.

Since Townsend's big-eared bats are usually found in areas to the west of the Appalachian Mountains, it seems that there is a big distance between each subspecies of these bats. According to many scientists, it seems that this separation has been present since the last ice age. It is hard for these bats to find suitable habitats due to their strict requirements when it comes to the temperature and humidity levels of caves.

=== Habitat and behavior ===
High activities of these bats have also been found high above cliffs in the Daniel Boone National Forest. Many studies have seemed to have inconsistent results, showing high bat activity on cliffs, forest habitats, and open fields/pastures. Bats were seldom seen flying over open spaces or flying above human occupied lands. The farthest a Virginia Big-Eared Bat has been observed foraging was 8.4 km from its roost. This was shown through radio telemetry. This study, located in Lee County, Kentucky, studied hills consisting of sandstone cliffs. The elevations varied from 182 meters to 424 meters, and limestone deposits under the sandstone resulted in the formation of caves. These caves are an ideal habitat for the Virginia big-eared bats. There is a large amount of variability when it comes to the use of foraging habitats between geographically isolated populations. In Kentucky, old fields have been shown to be important components of the foraging habitat of this subspecies. As a result, old fields should be taken care of and isolated from humans in the Daniel Boone National Forest. By doing this, this subspecies may use the location as a foraging habitat.

=== Habitat and seasons ===
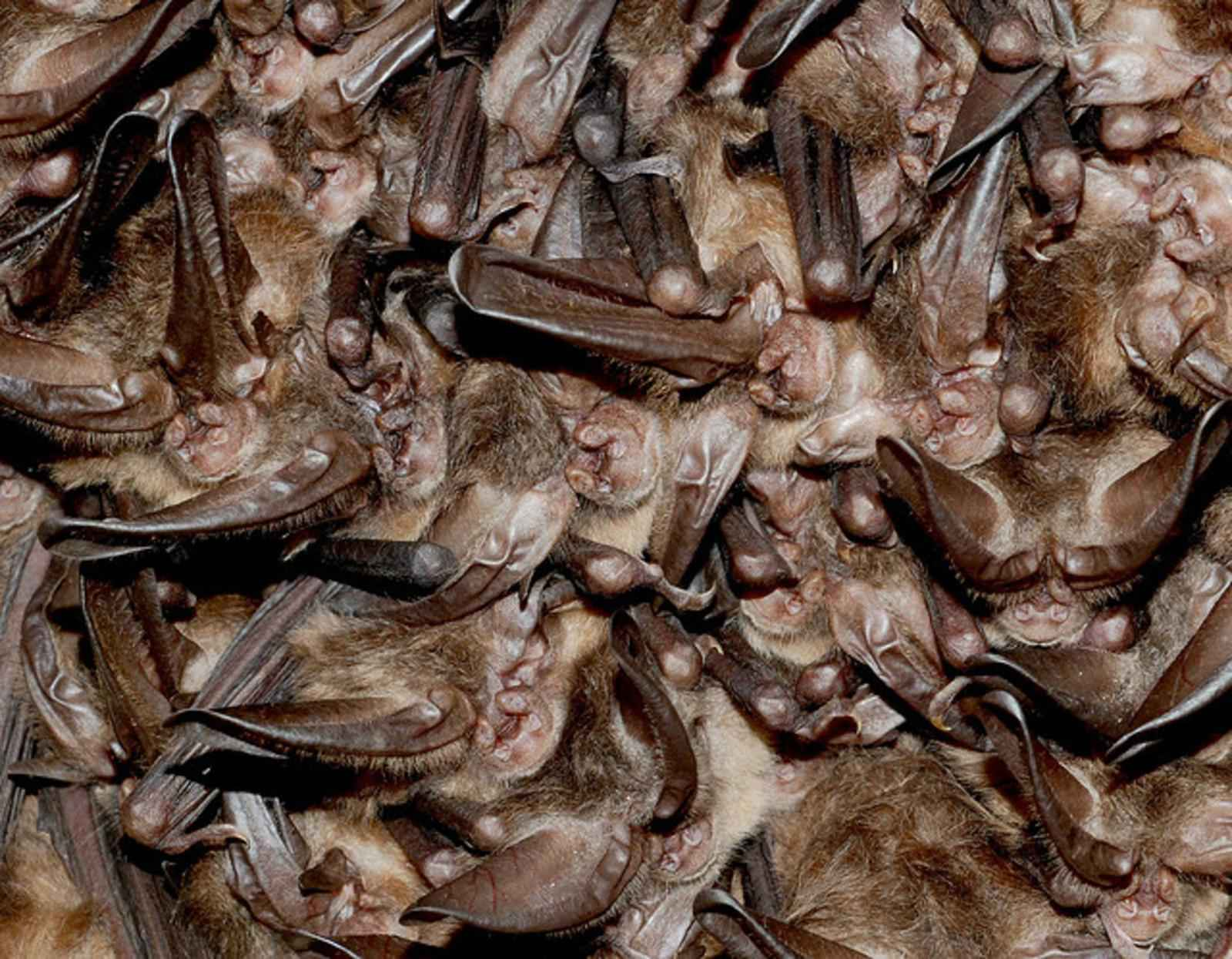
A tightly packed cluster of hibernating Virginia big-eared bats

During hibernation, these bats need an environment that ranges from 32 to 54 degrees Fahrenheit. Virginia big-eared bats store a certain amount of body fat in the winter during their hibernation, so when they are disturbed and the temperature of the cave changes, they must use up their body fat to raise the temperature of their bodies in order for them to leave the disturbed area. The burning of their fat makes them very weak and causes female bats to leave their babies if a maternity site is disturbed or altered. This is one of the main reasons why this subspecies of bats hibernate in tight clusters. These clusters occur at the opening of each cave, due to the suitable temperature and good ventilation. Maternity colonies are found in the warmer parts of the caves.

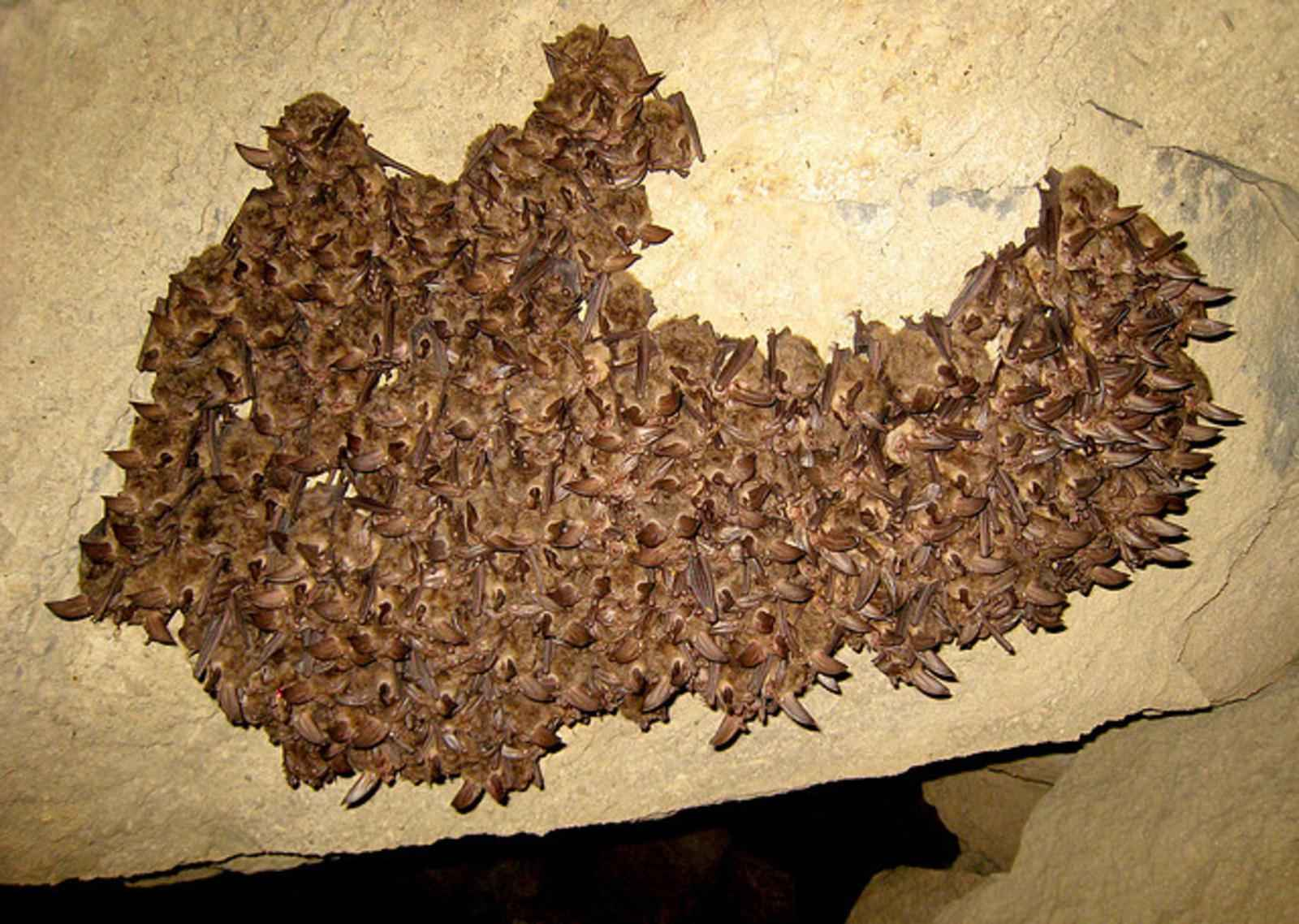
Hibernating Virginia big-eared bats

Most of these bats reside in Limestone caves based on the thermal warming of the roost, which is the most important factor when it comes to the habitat the mothers need when pregnant. Maternity patterns and timing are important because they change the requirements that the mothers need when it comes to habitat. Roosts in Virginia showed a decrease in the number of bats in late May to early June. In July, the population and activity levels at night increased drastically, showing that July is the most popular breeding and maternity time. There was a large increase in the movement and switching of roosts in August when it came to the males. However, it is unknown where the males spend the rest of their summer.

Over 5,000 Virginia big-eared bats, approximately 40 percent of the species' total population were found hibernating in Stillhouse Cave, in the Daniel Boone National Forest of Kentucky.

== Conservation status ==
Citizens of West Virginia were the first to notice a decline in the number of Virginia big-eared bats in local caves. The population of Virginia big-eared bats was estimated to be between 2,500 and 3,000 individuals in 1976. The cause of the decline is thought to be human sport, including spelunking, and general human disturbance in caves inhabited by the bats, which have lower tolerance to outside activity. The bats could also have been collected as a token for cave researchers because of their unique appearance. Inhabiting mines have been shown to also result in a decrease in population. Deforestation also presents itself as a problem. The Virginia Big-Eared Bat eats a variety of moths, some 45 different species, but 77.8% of those moths grow from larva that are dependent upon woody, forest plants for survival. Destruction of this environment would hurt the bats through both the destruction of habitable areas as well as by lowering of the population of their prey.

The Virginia big-eared bat was listed as endangered on December 31, 1979, and five caves in West Virginia were declared critical habitat for the bat. These caves were closed off to the public. The recovery plan was proposed in 1984. Cave sites preferred by Virginia big-eared bats would be gated off to prevent human disturbance, and colonies would be monitored for population surveys. Specifically, the recovery plan under the Endangered Species Act required the monitoring of population trends with minimally invasive infrared sensors, searching for undocumented caves of importance to Big-Eared Bats, preventing human disturbance of said caves by installing gates and signs, appropriate agencies protecting the caves providing habitat for solitary big-eared bats, preventing changes and damage to essential habitat, developing and maintaining support for species protection, preparing and maintaining a management profile for each colony site to record population and activity, and appointing a coordinator for all recovery and research efforts.

A 77% increase in population was recorded in 2009 since an initial report in 1983. The population increase of the Virginia big-eared bat is considered to be a successful revival due to the Endangered Species Act.

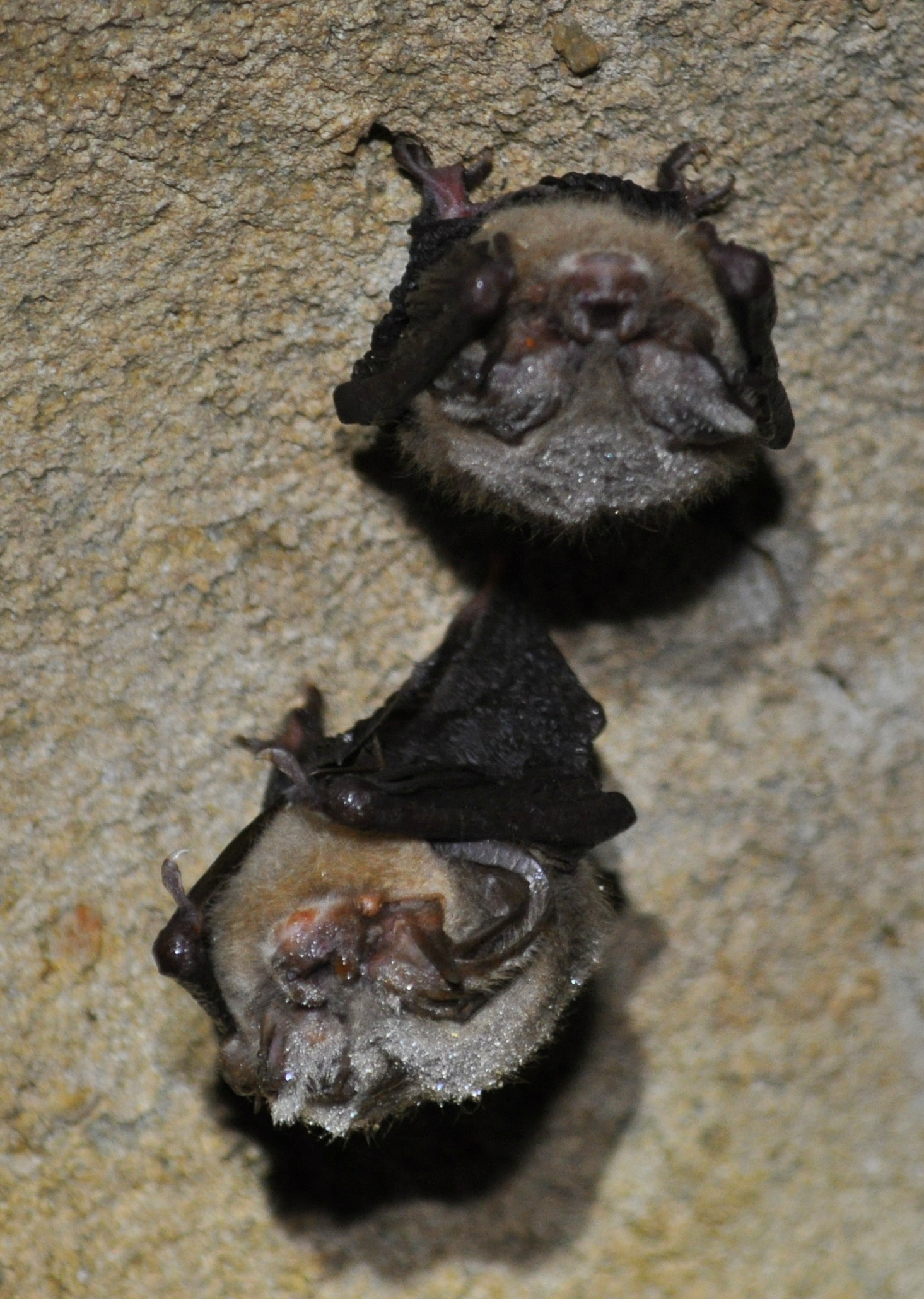
Torpid Virginia big-eared bats (Corynorhinus townsendii virginianus) with condensation photographed during a hibernaculum survey

=== Threat of white-nose syndrome ===
White-nose syndrome (WNS) is one of the worst wildlife diseases in recent history that is currently decimating North American cave-hibernating bat populations. This epidemic is responsible for mass mortalities in hibernating North American bats, and is caused by a uniquely cold-adapted fungus Pseudogymnoascus destructans. The fungus begins to grow on bats during the winter hibernation season, when bats are in torpor and immune-compromised. The body temperature of a hibernating bat is the optimal fungal growth environment. The fungus has affected 90% of species that hibernate in caves for the winter. Pseudogymnoascus destructans spores have been found growing on the Virginia big-eared bat. To date, no WNS mortality in this species has been observed although the syndrome has killed millions of its fellow cave-dwelling species. It is currently thought that the Big Ears may have a natural immunity to WNS through a yeast that the bat 'combs' over their body that inhibits the growth of the WNS fungus.

== See also ==
- Bats of the United States
- Bats of Canada
