= List of bats of the United States =

All bat species in the United States are insectivorous except for three nectar-eating species that migrate from Mexico and one fruit-eating species that inhabits the Florida Keys.

== Species ==
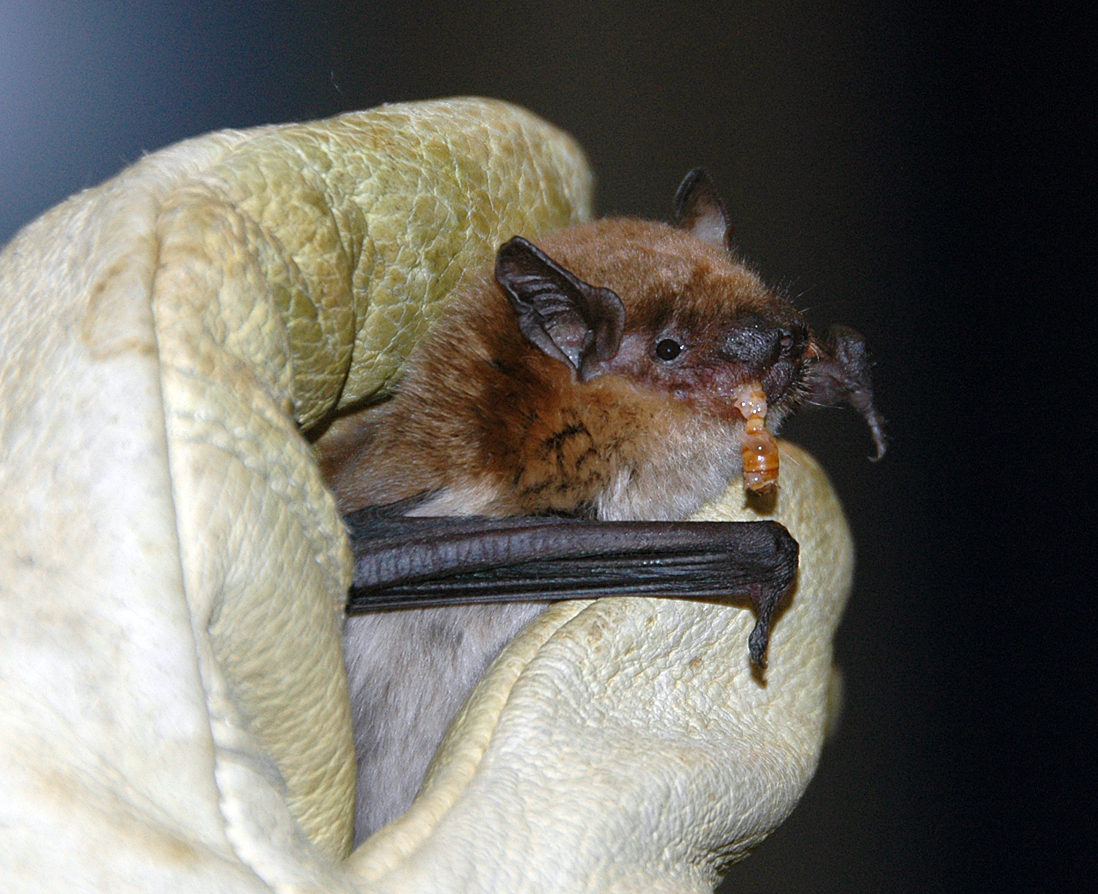
Big brown bat

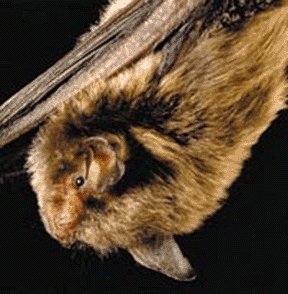
Indiana bat

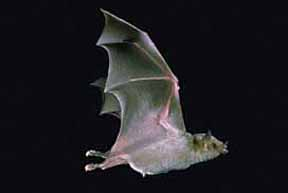
Mexican long-nosed bat

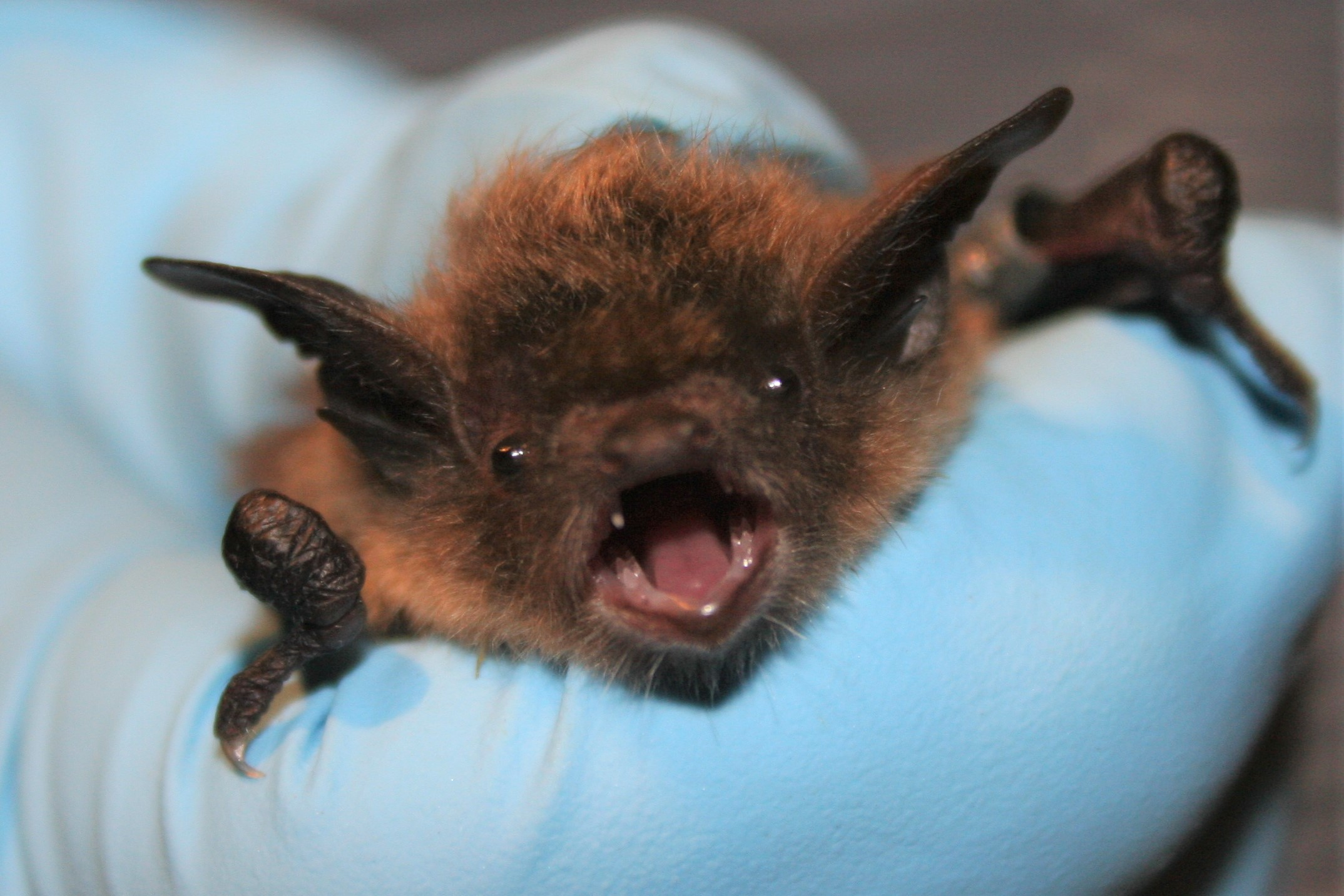
Little brown bat

Bats belong to the biological order of Chiroptera. The bat families found in North America are Vespertilionidae, Molossidae, Mormoopidae and Phyllostomidae.

=== Molossidae ===
- Florida bonneted bat, Eumops floridanus
- Wagner's bonneted bat, Eumops glaucinis
- Western mastiff bat, Eumops perotis
- Underwood's bonneted bat, Eumops underwoodi
- Velvety free-tailed bat, Molossus molossus
- Pocketed free-tailed bat, Nyctinomops femorosaccus
- Big free-tailed bat, Nyctinomops macrotis
- Mexican free-tailed bat, Tadarida brasiliensis

=== Mormoopidae ===
- Ghost-faced bat, Mormoops megalophylla

=== Phyllostomidae ===
- Jamaican fruit bat, Artibeus jamaicensis (Florida Keys only)
- Mexican long-tongued bat, Choeronycteris mexicana
- Mexican long-nosed bat, Leptonycteris nivalis
- California leaf-nosed bat, Macrotus californicus

=== Vespertilionidae ===
- Pallid bat, Antrozous pallidus
- Rafinesque's big-eared bat, Corynorhinus rafinesquii
- Townsend's big-eared bat, Corynorhinus townsendii
- Big brown bat, Eptesicus fuscus
- Spotted bat, Euderma maculatum
- Allen's big-eared bat, Idionycteris phyllotis
- Silver-haired bat, Lasionycteris noctivagans
- Western red bat, Lasiurus blossevillii
- Eastern red bat, Lasiurus borealis
- Hoary bat, Lasiurus cinereus
- Southern yellow bat, Lasiurus ega
- Northern yellow bat Lasiurus intermedius
- Seminole bat, Lasiurus seminolus
- Southwestern myotis, Myotis auriculus
- Southeastern myotis, Myotis austroriparius
- California myotis, Myotis californicus
- Western small-footed myotis, Myotis ciliolabrum
- Long-eared myotis, Myotis evotis
- Gray bat, Myotis grisescens
- Keen's myotis, Myotis keenii
- Eastern small-footed myotis, Myotis leibii
- Little brown bat, Myotis lucifugus
- Arizona myotis, Myotis occultus
- Northern long-eared myotis, Myotis septentrionalis
- Indiana bat, Myotis sodalis
- Fringed myotis, Myotis thysanodes
- Cave myotis, Myotis velifer
- Long-legged myotis, Myotis volans
- Yuma myotis, Myotis yumanensis
- Evening bat, Nycticeius humeralis
- Canyon bat, Parastrellus hesperus
- Tricolored bat, Perimyotis subflavus

== Notable bat roosts ==
In 2009 the Grandview Mine in the Grand Canyon National Park had gates added to support on-going bat research, preserve historic mine resources, and promote visitor safety.

The Ann W. Richards Congress Avenue Bridge, which crosses over Lady Bird Lake in Austin, Texas, is the world's largest urban bat colony.

Seventeen species of bats live in the Carlsbad Caverns National Park, including a large number of Mexican free-tailed bats. It has been estimated that the population of Mexican free-tailed bats once numbered in the millions but has declined drastically in modern times. The cause of this decline is unknown but the pesticide DDT is often listed as a primary cause.

== State insignia ==
As of February 2011, at least three states had an official bat. Hawai'i named the Hawaiian hoary bat as the official state land mammal in April 2015. The general assembly of North Carolina considered a bill in 2007 that would have made Rafinesque's big-eared bat as its state bat. The bill passed 92-15, but died in the state senate. In 2020, the big brown bat was designated the official state mammal of the District of Columbia. In 2023, a successful campaign was launched to make the pallid bat the state bat of California. The bill passed both houses unanimously and took effect on January 1, 2024.

State	State bat	Scientific name	Image	Year adopted
Oklahoma	Mexican free-tailed bat	Tadarida brasiliensis	Closeup of Mexican free-tailed bat	2006
Texas	Mexican free-tailed bat	Tadarida brasiliensis	Closeup of Mexican free-tailed bat	1995
Virginia	Virginia big-eared bat	Corynorhinus townsendii virginianus	a large bat with mouth open, and wings unfurled, lit up against a black background	2005
California	Pallid bat	Antrozous pallidus		2024

== See also ==
- Environment of the United States
