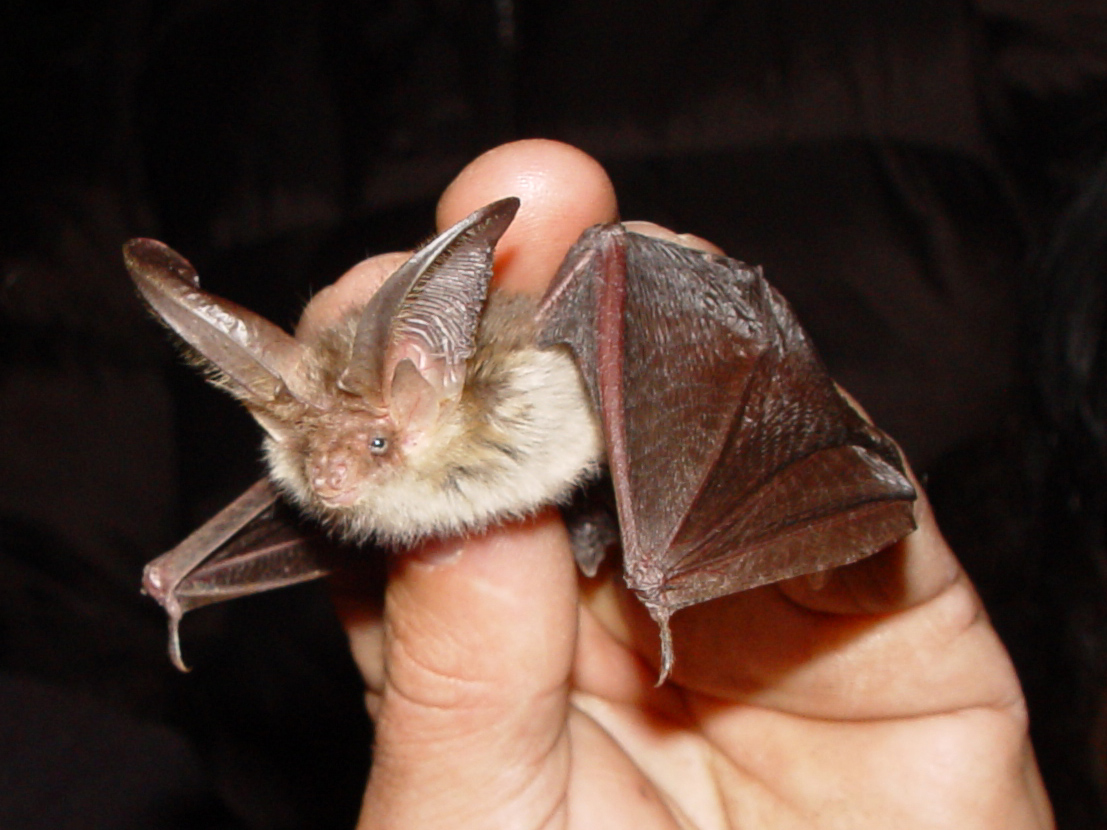
- Brown long-eared bat (Plecotus auritus)

Scientific classification
- Kingdom: Animalia
- Phylum: Chordata
- Class: Mammalia
- Order: Chiroptera
- Family: Vespertilionidae
- Subfamily: Vespertilioninae
- Tribe: Plecotini; Gray, 1866

Genera
- Barbastella; Corynorhinus; Euderma; Idionycteris; Otonycteris; Plecotus

= Plecotini =

Plecotini Temporal range: Early Oligocene–present

Tribe of vesper bats

Plecotini is a tribe of bats in the family Vespertilionidae. It contains several genera found throughout the Northern Hemisphere, in Eurasia, North Africa, and North America. Several genera in this tribe are known as big-eared bats or long-eared bats. It also contains the spotted bat and barbastelles.

The oldest fossil record of this group is Qinetia from the early Oligocene of Belgium.

== Species ==
Species in the tribe include:

- Genus Barbastella – barbastelles or barbastelle bats
  - Western barbastelle, Barbastella barbastellus
  - Beijing barbastelle, Barbastella beijingensis
  - Caspian barbastelle, Barbastella caspica
  - Eastern barbastelle or Asian barbastelle, Barbastella darjelingensis
  - Arabian barbastelle, Barbastella leucomelas
  - Japanese barbastelle, Barbastella pacifica
- Genus Corynorhinus – American lump-nosed bats
  - Rafinesque's big-eared bat, Corynorhinus rafinesquii
  - Mexican big-eared bat, Corynorhinus mexicanus
  - Leon Paniagua's big-eared bat, Corynorhinus leonpaniaguae
  - Townsend's big-eared bat, Corynorhinus townsendii
- Genus Euderma
  - Spotted bat, Euderma maculatum
- Genus Idionycteris
  - Allen's big-eared bat, Idionycteris phyllotis
- Genus Otonycteris
  - Desert long-eared bat, Otonycteris hemprichii
  - Turkestani long-eared bat, Otonycteris leucophaea
- Genus Plecotus – lump-nosed bats
  - Brown long-eared bat, Plecotus auritus
  - Grey long-eared bat, Plecotus austriacus
  - Ethiopian long-eared bat, Plecotus balensis
  - Christie's long-eared bat, Plecotus christii
  - Gaisler's long-eared bat, Plecotus gaisleri
  - Himalayan long-eared bat, Plecotus homochrous
  - Mediterranean long-eared bat, Plecotus kolombatovici
  - Kozlov's long-eared bat, Plecotus kozlovi
  - Alpine long-eared bat, Plecotus macrobullaris
  - Ognev's long-eared bat Plecotus ognevi
  - Japanese long-eared bat, Plecotus sacrimontis
  - Sardinian long-eared bat, Plecotus sardus
  - Strelkov's long-eared bat, Plecotus strelkovi
  - Taiwan long-eared bat, Plecotus taivanus
  - Canary long-eared bat, Plecotus teneriffae
  - Turkmen long-eared bat, Plecotus turkmenicus
  - Ward's long-eared bat, Plecotus wardi

=== Fossil species ===
- †Qinetia
  - †Qinetia misonnei (early Oligocene of Belgium)
