= Strelkov's long-eared bat =

Conservation status
- Least Concern (IUCN 3.1)

Scientific classification
- Kingdom: Animalia
- Phylum: Chordata
- Class: Mammalia
- Order: Chiroptera
- Family: Vespertilionidae
- Genus: Plecotus
- Species: P. strelkovi

Binomial name
- Plecotus strelkovi Spitzenberger, 2006

Species of vesper bat

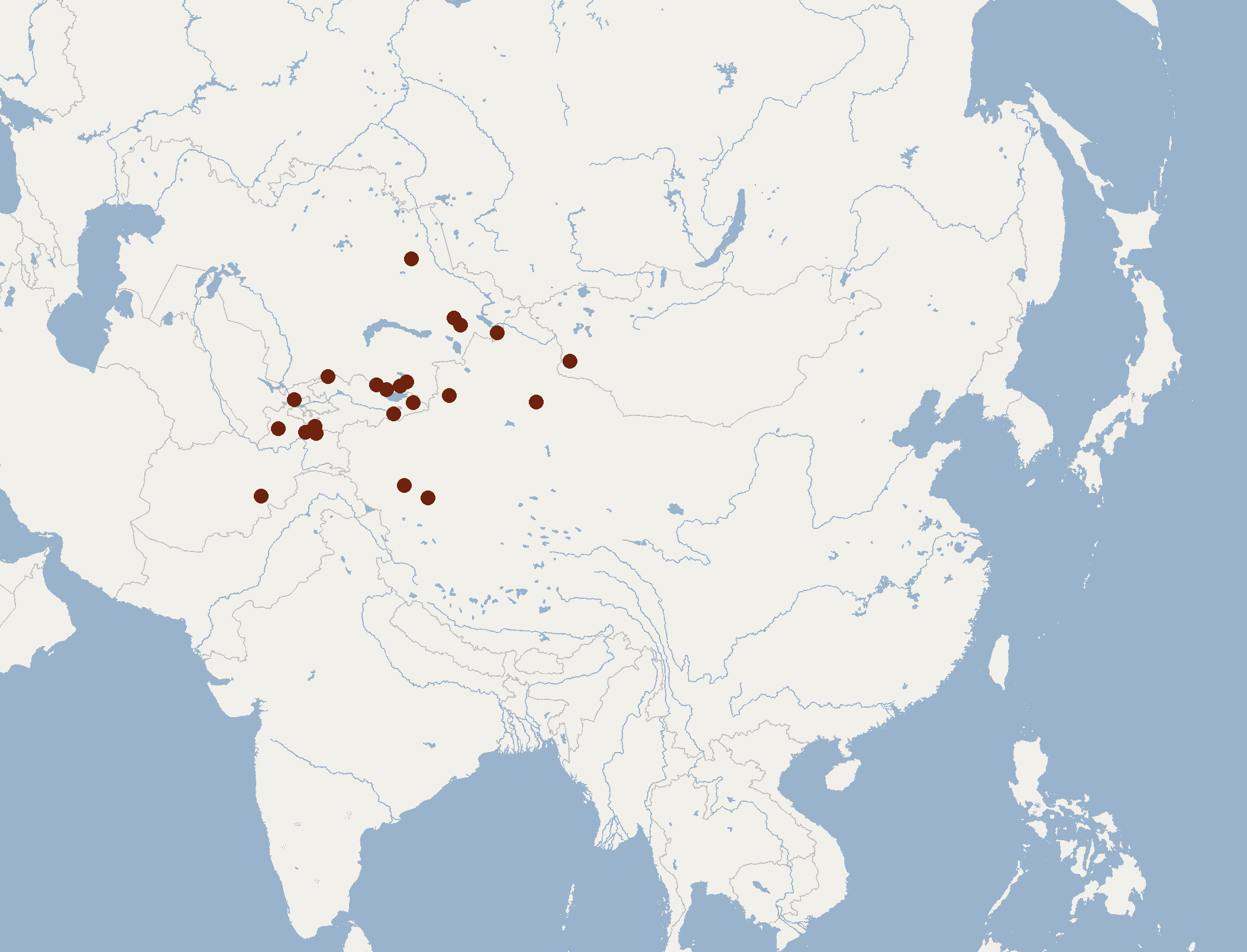
Distribution of Plecotus strelkovi

Strelkov's long-eared bat (Plecotus strelkovi) is a species of vesper bat found in mountainous regions of Central Asia.

== Taxonomy ==
It was described in 2006 based on specimens previously classified without justification as Ward's long-eared bat (P. wardi) and later the grey long-eared bat (P. austriacus). However, genetic and morphological evidence confirmed that these populations represented a distinct, previously undescribed species, and it was described as Plecotus strelkovi. Phylogenetic evidence supports it being a sister species to a group comprising Christie's long-eared bat (P. christii), the Mediterranean long-eared bat (P. kolombatovici), and the grey long-eared bat (P. austriacus). It is accepted as a distinct species by the American Society of Mammalogists, the IUCN Red List, and the ITIS.

The species is named in honor of Russian mammalogist Petr Petrovich Strelkov.

== Distribution and habitat ==
It is native to the xeric mountain ranges of Central Asia and adjoining regions. It ranges from northeastern Iran through the mountains of Central Asia, and east to northwestern China. It is found in the Pamir and Tien Shan mountain ranges. It is known from montane and forest-steppe habitats.

== Status ==
This species is considered Least Concern on the IUCN Red List and does not face any major threats.

== See also ==
- Plecotus
