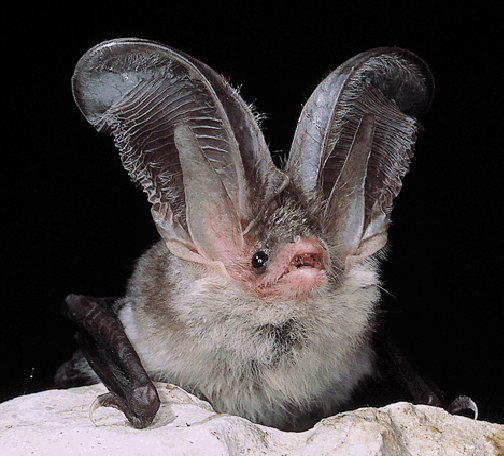

Conservation status
- Critically Endangered (IUCN 3.1)

Scientific classification
- Kingdom: Animalia
- Phylum: Chordata
- Class: Mammalia
- Infraclass: Placentalia
- Order: Chiroptera
- Family: Vespertilionidae
- Genus: Plecotus
- Species: P. sardus

Binomial name
- Plecotus sardus Mucedda, Kiefer, Pidincedda and Vieth 2002

= Sardinian long-eared bat =

Species of bat

The Sardinian long-eared bat (Plecotus sardus) is a critically-endangered species of bat endemic to Sardinia, Italy.

This species was discovered in 2002 in the caves of central Sardinia, the type locality being a cave in Lanaitto's Valley in the Oliena District. It appears to be closely related to Plecotus auritus and Plecotus macrobullaris. It was identified as a new species by a study clearly showing divergence from other Plecotus species in its mitochondrial 16S rRNA gene.

== Description ==
P. sardus is a small bat with a head-and-body length of about 45 mm (1.8 in), ears of about 38 mm (1.5 in) and a weight of up to 9 g (0.32 oz). The snout is cone-shaped with a fleshy knob on the chin. The ears are oval and joined above the forehead by a fine membrane. The tragus is tapered with a blunt tip and is half as long as the ear. The wing membranes are attached to the rear part of the base of the fifth toe. The tail is long and extends a short way beyond the interfemoral membrane. The fur is fine, long and woolly and is greyish-brown dorsally and whitish or pale brown ventrally. The wing membranes are brown. Two features which distinguish this bat from related species are the cylindrical penis in males and the short, Y-shaped penile bone.

== Ecology and distribution ==
The Sardinian long-eared bat is only known from three caves where it roosts. Two of these are in the Gennargentu National Park and one near the coast. Its distribution is highly localized, mainly in central and north coastal areas of Sardinia, and includes the municipalities of Baunei, Busachi, Dorgali, Lula, Oliena, Orgosolo, Ula Tirso, Urzulei, and Gavoi. It hunts in forests at low elevation and favors calcareous terrain.

== Conservation and threats ==
The primary threat to the Sardinian long-eared is climate change, which has resulted in recurring wildfires around its reproductive areas and in precipitation and temperature extremes during the summer. Secondary threats include direct human interference and competition with invasive feral pigeons for nesting sites.

Between 2003 and 2020, the total population of the long-eared bat dropped from 950 to 340 individuals, resulting in a population loss of around 63,4%. With a small total population and a decreasing population trend, the International Union for Conservation of Nature lists it as being a "critically endangered species". This bat is the sole surviving endemic mammal found on the Island of Sardinia, the others all having become extinct since the arrival of humans some 8,500 years ago. Due to its uniqueness and restricted range P. sardus requires a very specific management strategy for its protection to be successful.
