= Westerham Mines =

Protected area in Kent, England

Coordinates: 51.257°N 0.084°E

- Site of Special Scientific Interest
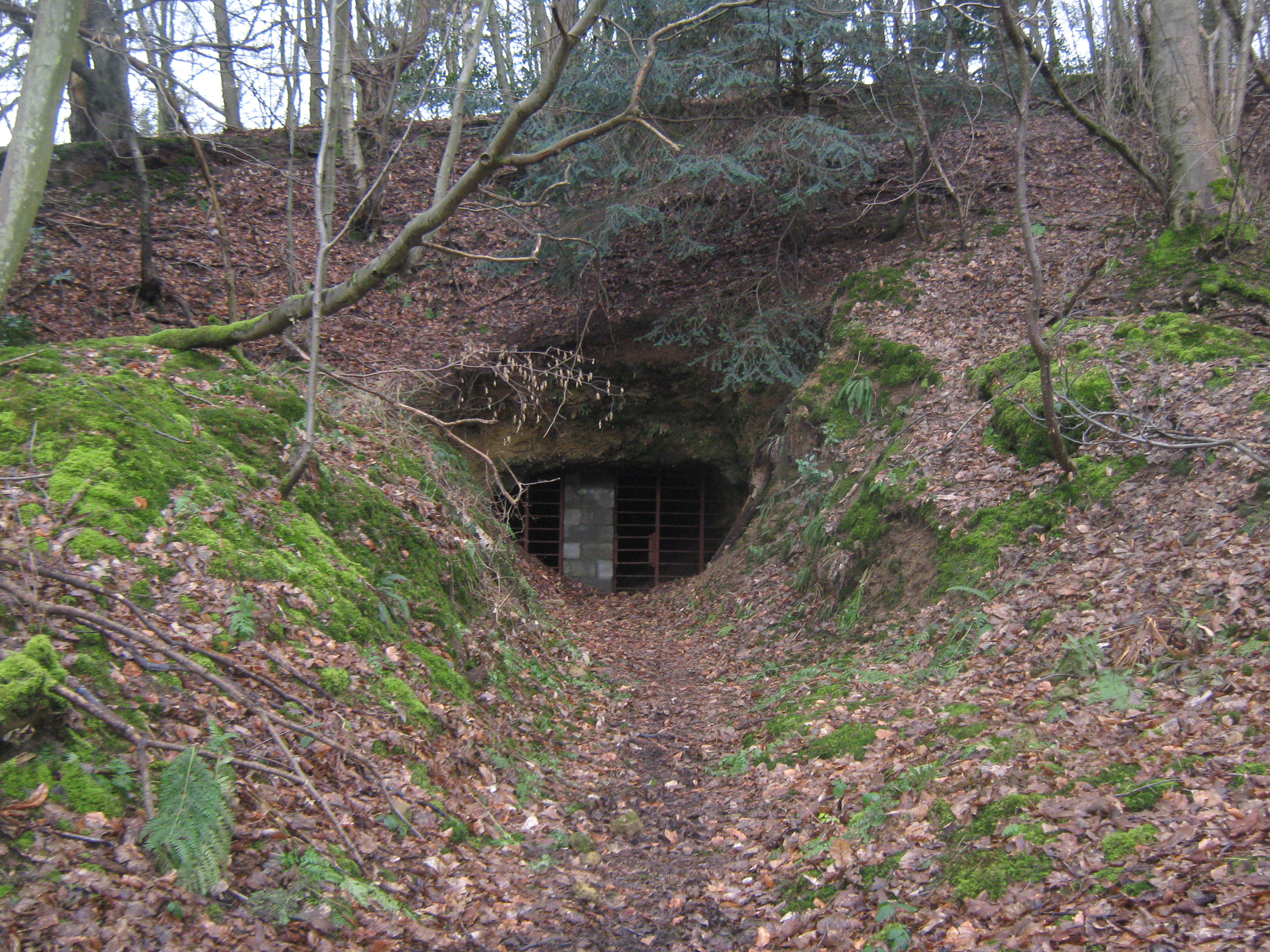
- Location of Westerham Mines.
- Area of search: Kent
- Grid reference: TQ 455 529
- Interest: Biological
- Area: 25.4 hectares (63 acres)
- Notification date: 1986
- Location map: Magic Map

Westerham Mines is a 25.4-hectare (63-acre) biological Site of Special Scientific Interest south of Westerham in Kent.

The main interest of this site lies in the use of former mines by five species of bats for hibernation. They are the whiskered, Brandt's, Daubenton's, Natterer's and long-eared bats. Some moths also hibernate in the mines.

There is access to the site, but not the mines which are sealed off by grilles. Many of the structures in the area are made of sandstone and ragstone, which were originally extracted from the mines. Among them, structures are certainly the church in the area. Many tubes in the tunnel complex are only four feet high, and others are much lower due to backfilling.
