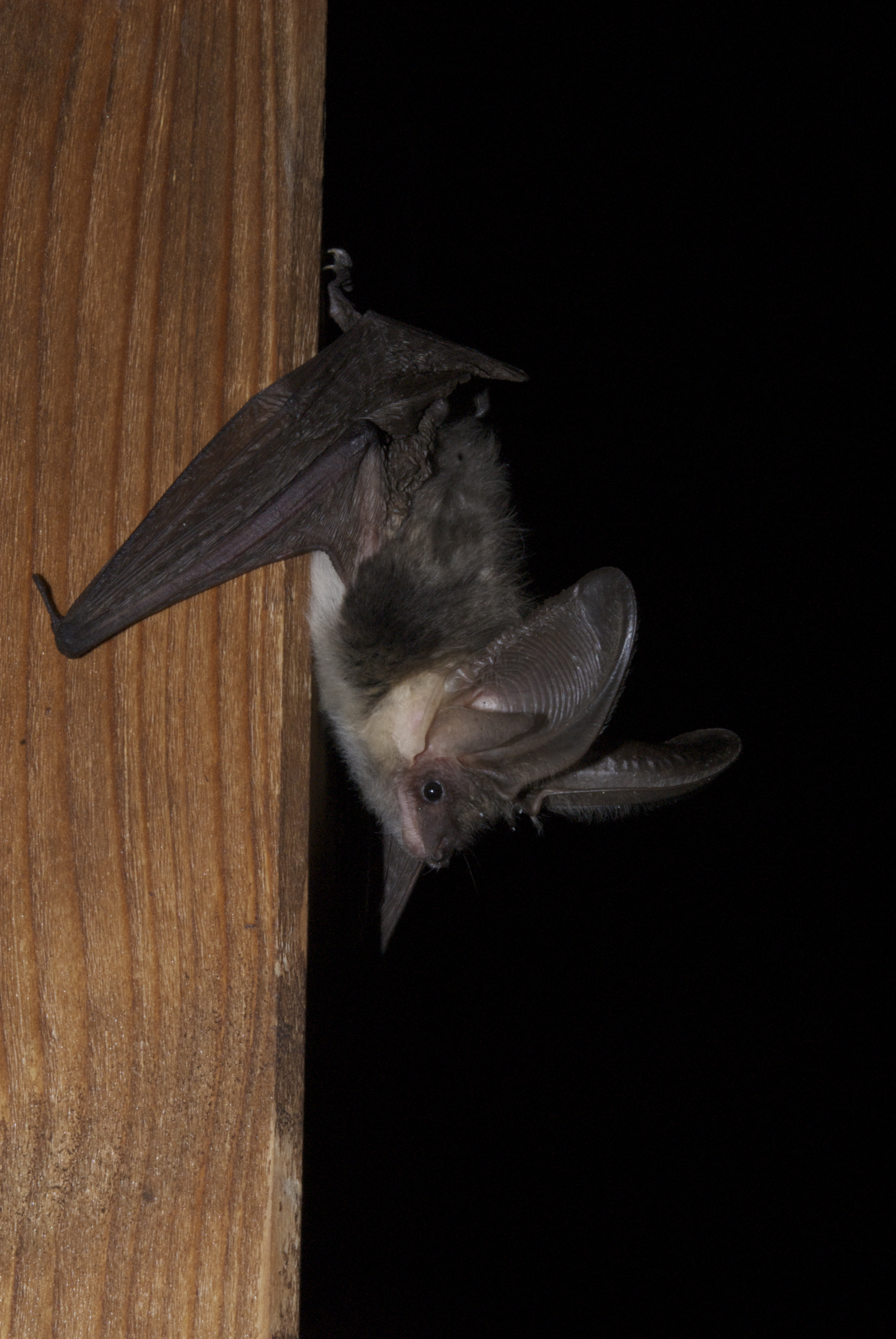

Conservation status
- Least Concern (IUCN 3.1)

Scientific classification
- Kingdom: Animalia
- Phylum: Chordata
- Class: Mammalia
- Order: Chiroptera
- Family: Vespertilionidae
- Genus: Plecotus
- Species: P. macrobullaris

Binomial name
- Plecotus macrobullaris Kuzjakin, 1965

Synonyms
- Plecotus auritus macrobullaris Kuzjakin, 1965; Plecotus alpinus Keifer & Veith, 2002; Plecotus microdontus Spitzenberger, 2002

= Alpine long-eared bat =

Species of bat

The Alpine long-eared bat or mountain long-eared bat (Plecotus macrobullaris) is a species of long-eared bat. It was originally described from Switzerland and Austria as a species intermediate between the brown long-eared bat and the grey long-eared bat in 1965. It was later described in 2002, from France and Austria, respectively. Despite its name, this species is not restricted to the Alps, being found in Croatia, Bosnia and Herzegovina and elsewhere. It differs from other European long-eared bats, such as the brown long-eared bat, by its white underparts.

== Taxonomy and etymology ==
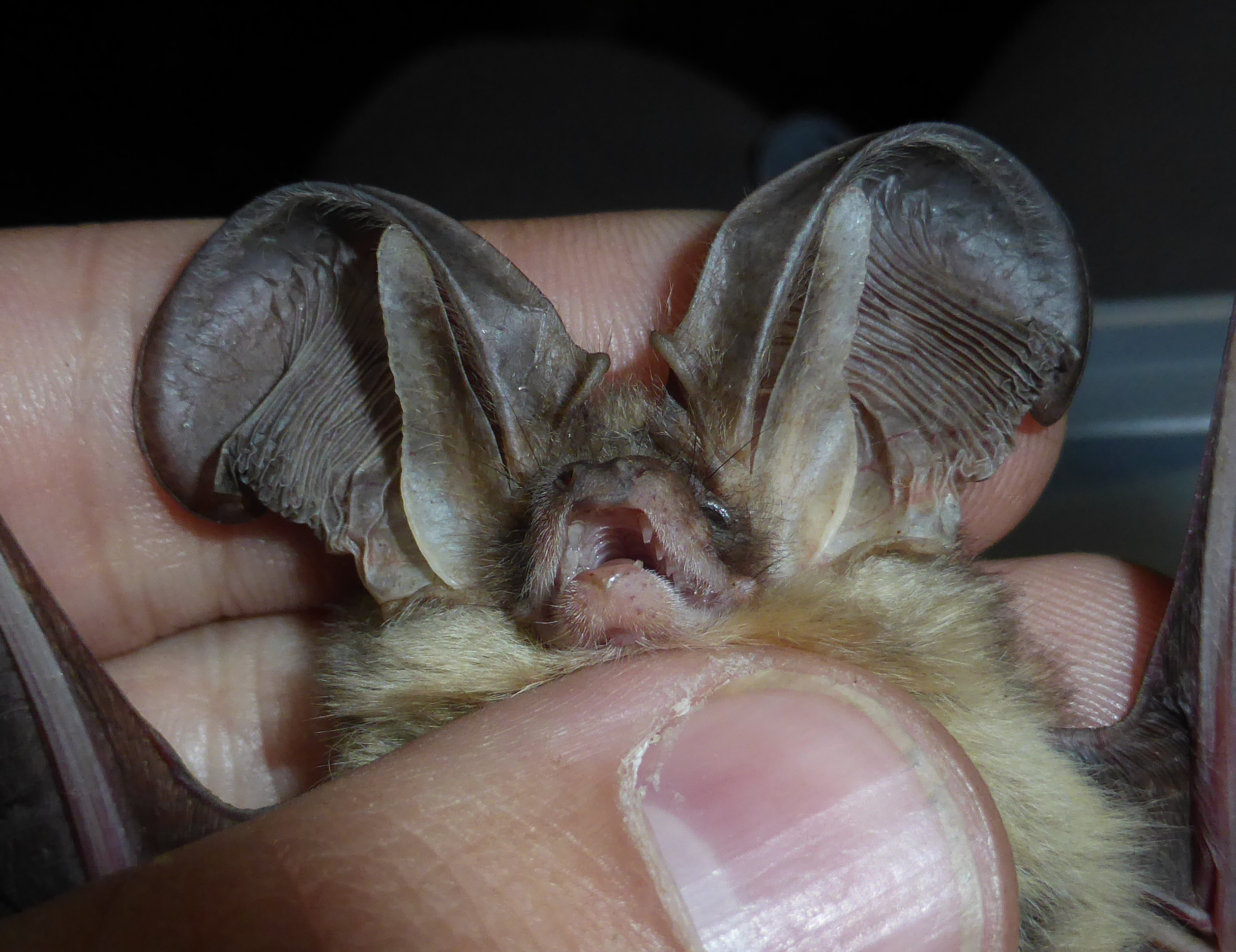
Close view of the lip pad of the bat Plecotus macrobullaris.

It was described as a new subspecies in 1965 by A. Kuzjakin, who considered it a subspecies of the brown long-eared bat, Plecotus auritus. Its trinomen at the time was Plecotus auritus macrobullaris. Andreas Kiefer and Michael Veith described a new taxon, Plecotus alpinus, in the 2001 volume of the journal Myotis, but the name was made available in 2002 only. In 2002 too, another set of authors led by Friederike Spitzenberger described the same species under the name Plecotus microdontus. DNA analysis showed that both "species" were synonymous, and according to the Principle of Priority, the oldest name should apply to this species. However, in 2003, it was determined that both P. alpinus and P. microdontus were synonyms of the previous taxon described Kuzyakin in 1965, which was then raised to species status as Plecotus macrobullaris.

Its species name "macrobullaris" is from Ancient Greek "makrós" meaning "long" and Latin "bulla" meaning "knob-shaped," possibly referencing the auditory bulla.

== Distribution ==
The Alpine long-eared bat has been recorded from Andorra, France and Spain in the Pyrenees; in the Alps it has been recorded from France to Slovenia, in the Dinaric Alps and through the Balkans to Greece. It is also found on Crete and Corsica. In Asia is occurs in Anatolia through the Caucasus as far south as Iran and Syria. It mostly inhabits steep mountainous terrain, up to a maximum of 2,800 metres (9,200 ft) but is known to reach sea level in some localities.

In 2015, it was reported that the species contains two distinct mitochondrial lineages, which diverged from each other over 1 million years ago. However, it remains unclear whether or not the lineages are distinct in other respects, and therefore whether or not they should be considered distinct subspecies. Nonetheless, two subspecies have been tentatively suggested:

- P. m. macrobullaris - populations east of the Alps
- P. m. alpinus - the Alps and Pyrenees

== Description ==
The Alpine long-eared bat is a medium-sized bat, with a forearm length of approximately 4 centimetres (1.6 in) and a body weight of 6 to 10 grams (0.21 to 0.35 oz). It has pale grey fur over the body, fading to near-white on the underparts and with a dark brown face. The ears are long and a pinkish triangular pad projects downwards from the chin. There is no distinction in the size or colouration of the sexes.

== Biology and behaviour ==
Tha bat's diet is mainly based on moths, which are captured in open areas such as grasslands and alpine meadows. Its echolocation calls are similar to those of other long-eared bats, consisting of very faint multiharmonic signals, with the first harmonic sweeping down from 46 to 23 kHz and lasting up to 7 milliseconds.

The Alpine long-eared bat seems to be flexible in its choice of roosting habitats, being reported to roost primarily in natural rock crevices in the Pyrenees, but to prefer the attics of human dwellings in the Alps. Roosts are sometimes shared with other related species, but this is unusual. While males change their roosting sites on an almost daily basis, females tend to remain in the same site for long periods, gathering together in brooding colonies of 5 to 25 individuals.
