= Ward's long-eared bat =

Conservation status
- Least Concern (IUCN 3.1)

Scientific classification
- Kingdom: Animalia
- Phylum: Chordata
- Class: Mammalia
- Order: Chiroptera
- Family: Vespertilionidae
- Genus: Plecotus
- Species: P. wardi

Binomial name
- Plecotus wardi Thomas, 1911

Synonyms
- Plecotus ariel Thomas, 1911

Species of vesper bat

Ward's long-eared bat (Plecotus wardi) is a species of vesper bat in the family Vespertilionidae. It is found in mountainous regions of South Asia and adjoining regions.

== Taxonomy ==
It was described in 1911 by Oldfield Thomas, but was later reclassified as conspecific with the grey long-eared bat (P. austriacus). However, a 2006 study confirmed it as a distinct species using genetic and morphological evidence, and revived it as such. The results of this study have been followed by the American Society of Mammalogists, the IUCN Red List, and the ITIS. It was named after Colonel A. E. Ward, an amateur naturalist and member of the Bombay Natural History Society.

Plecotus ariel was described as a new species in 1911 by Oldfield Thomas. The holotype is the only individual that has ever been documented. It had been collected in Kangding, China at an elevation of 2,600 m (8,400 ft) above sea level, as part of the Duke of Bedford's Zoological Expedition, led by Malcolm Playfair Anderson. It was similar in appearance to Ognev's long-eared bat. It was sometimes included as a subspecies of the grey long-eared bat (Plecotus austriacus). However, the same study that revived P. wardi found P. ariel to be synonymous with it, and thus synonymized P. ariel with it. This has been followed by the ASM and the ITIS, although the IUCN still classifies P. ariel as a Data Deficient species.

== Distribution and habitat ==
It is found in the Himalayas and Hindu Kush mountains, ranging from northeastern Afghanistan through the Himalayas of India and Pakistan, south to Nepal and Sichuan, China. It roosts in caves surrounded by coniferous forest, and occasionally in human-built structures.

== Description ==
It has a forearm length of approximately 44 mm (1.7 in). Its forearm, thumb, and claw lengths are among the greatest in its genus. It has a medium-sized skull relative to other members of its genus, with a greatest length of 17.2 mm (0.68 in). Its orbital processes and zygomatic arches are weak, with the orbit (eye socket) elliptical in shape. It can be differentiated from other members of Plecotus by its large body size and darker fur.

== Status ==
It may be threatened by cave tourism and destruction, both of which may lead to a decline in habitat quality. It may also be threatened by the demolition of abandoned buildings that serve as roosting sites. However, due to its wide distribution, it is presently listed as Least Concern.
