= Himalayan long-eared bat =

Conservation status
- Data Deficient (IUCN 3.1)

Scientific classification
- Kingdom: Animalia
- Phylum: Chordata
- Class: Mammalia
- Order: Chiroptera
- Family: Vespertilionidae
- Genus: Plecotus
- Species: P. homochrous

Binomial name
- Plecotus homochrous Hodgson, 1847

Species of bat

The Himalayan long-eared bat (Plecotus homochrous), also known as Hodgson's long-eared bat, is a species of bat in the family Vespertilionidae. It is ranges from the Indian subcontinent east to China and south to Vietnam.

== Taxonomy ==
It was previously considered a subspecies of P. auritus. It was raised to species level by Spitzenberger.

== Habitat and distribution ==
The species is found in India, Pakistan, and Nepal, from Murree in Pakistan through Nepal up until Darjeeling in India. It is also known from China and Vietnam. It inhabits the montane and steppe forests of the Himalayas, from 2,000 to 3,938 metres (6,560 to 12,920 ft) above sea level.

== Conservation ==
The species is assessed as data-deficient by the IUCN due to lack of information about it. It has a range of over 20,000 km^{2} (7,700 sq mi), but could inhabit only 2,000 km^{2} (770 sq mi) of those.
