= Turkestani long-eared bat =

Turkestani long-eared Bat

Conservation status
- Data Deficient (IUCN 3.1)

Scientific classification
- Kingdom: Animalia
- Phylum: Chordata
- Class: Mammalia
- Order: Chiroptera
- Family: Vespertilionidae
- Genus: Otonycteris
- Species: O. leucophaea

Binomial name
- Otonycteris leucophaea (N. A. Severcov, 1873)

Synonyms
- Plecotus leucophaea N. A. Severcov, 1873

Species of bat

The Turkestani long-eared bat (Otonycteris leucophaea) is a species of bat found in Asia. Though it was initially described in 1873 as a species, for many years it was considered synonymous with the desert long-eared bat, Otonycteris hemprichii. Recently, it was recognized as a distinct species once again.

== Taxonomy ==
It was described by Russian explorer and naturalist Nikolaj Alekseevič Severcov in 1873, who named it Plecotus leucophaea. In 1925, its name was changed to Otonycteris leucophaea. Since its initial description, its taxonomic status has changed several times. Only recently was it revised to species-level again, in a paper published in 2010. The authors of the paper concluded that the genus Otonycteris, which was previously viewed as monotypic, actually consisted of two species: the desert long-eared bat, Otonycteris hemprichii, and the Turkestani long-eared bat, Otonycteris leucophaea. They drew this conclusion based on morphological and genetic differences between the two populations. Based on their reclassification, the desert long-eared bat is found in North Africa and the Middle East, while the Turkestani long-eared bat is found in Central Asia. The authors of the 2010 paper stated that there is a large amount of variation within the Turkestani long-eared bat, which they ascribed to three tentative, unnamed subspecies.

== Description ==
Members of the genus Otonycteris are the largest vesper bats in their geographic range. It has a large skull with robust teeth. Its dental formula is 1.1.1.33.1.2.3 for a total of 30 teeth. Its forearm is 56.8–65.5 mm (2.24–2.58 in) long. It differs from the desert long-eared bat due to its smaller auditory bullae, longer snout, and less-curved baculum. From snout to tail, individuals are 119–130 mm (4.7–5.1 in) long. Its ears are 29.8–31.5 mm (1.17–1.24 in) long and 14.8–26.7 mm (0.58–1.05 in) wide. The tragus is 14.1–14.7 mm (0.56–0.58 in) long and 4.0–4.4 mm (0.16–0.17 in) wide.

== Biology ==
It forages by gleaning arthropods from the ground. Prey items include scorpions, spiders, beetles, cockroaches and termites, grasshoppers, crickets, and katydids, and camel spiders.

== Range and habitat ==
So far, it has been documented in several countries throughout Asia, including Afghanistan, Iran, Kazakhstan, Kyrgyzstan, Pakistan, Tajikistan, Turkmenistan, and Uzbekistan. It is found at elevations from 300–1,500 m (980–4,920 ft) above sea level. Dry steppes and deserts are its preferred habitat.

== Conservation ==
As it was only recently elevated to a species again and not much is known about it, the IUCN currently evaluates it as data deficient. Possible threats to this species include disturbance of their roosts by humans, and pesticide exposure from consuming affected insects. At least some of its habitat is protected where it occurs in the Parvand protected area in northeast Iran.
