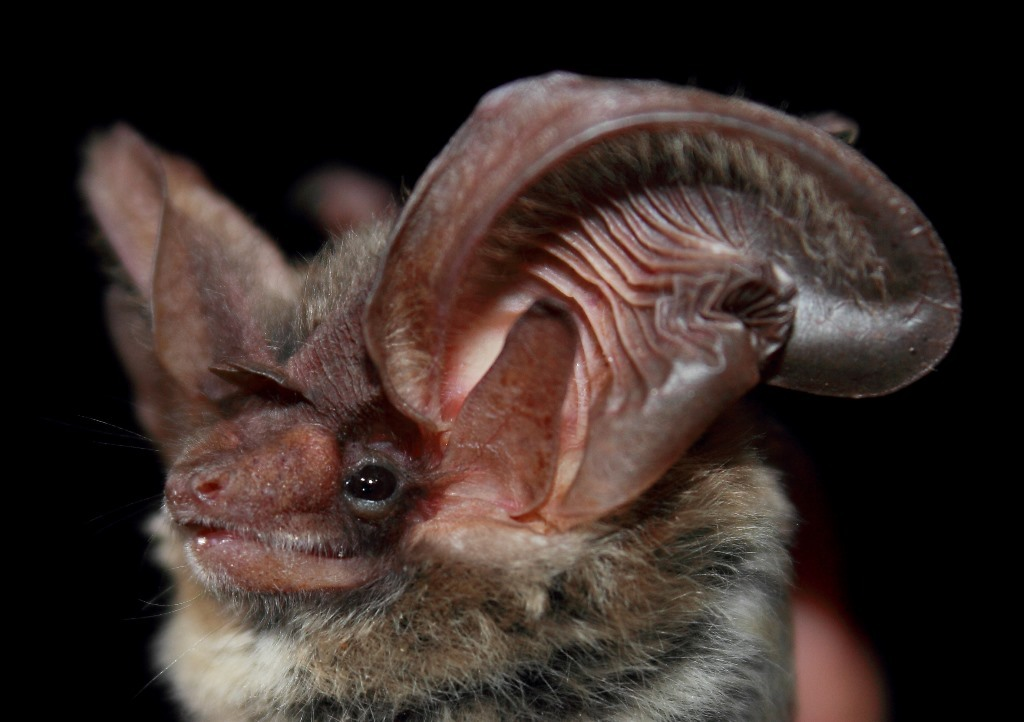

Conservation status
- Least Concern (IUCN 3.1)

Scientific classification
- Kingdom: Animalia
- Phylum: Chordata
- Class: Mammalia
- Order: Chiroptera
- Family: Vespertilionidae
- Tribe: Plecotini
- Genus: Idionycteris; Anthony, 1923
- Species: I. phyllotis

Binomial name
- Idionycteris phyllotis G.M. Allen, 1916

= Allen's big-eared bat =

Species of bat

Allen's big-eared bat (Idionycteris phyllotis), also known as the lappet-browed bat, is a species of vesper bat in the monotypic genus Idionycteris. It occurs in Mexico and in Arizona, California, Nevada, New Mexico, Utah, and Colorado in the United States.

== Description ==
Idionycteris phyllotis is a bat with large ears, weighing 8 to 16 grams. On the dorsal side they possess long and soft pelage, (fur). Their fur is basally blackish in color with tips that are a yellow-gray color. They have a black patch on each shoulder, a tuft of white hair on the backside of the ears, as well as ventral hairs that are black with pale tips. The calcar possesses a low keel. The uropatagium has 12 to 13 transverse ribs. The rostrum is flattened and broad. They have distinctive lappets (disc-shaped protrusions), which project from the base of the ears onto the brow of the bat.

I. phyllotis has an external morphology common to that of gleaning bats, and are thus well adapted for plucking stationary insects from surfaces. To do this they have long tragi and ears, wings adapted for maneuverability and hovering flight, and a gracile jaw. I. phyllotis) is the only species in North America known to emit long, constant frequency-frequency modulated echolocation calls.

== Range and habitat ==
Allen's big-eared bat inhabits the southwestern mountainous regions of Mexico and the United States. This species occupies a wide range in elevation, ranging from 855 m to 3,225 m, though most specimens reside at altitudes between 1,100 m and 2,500 m.
