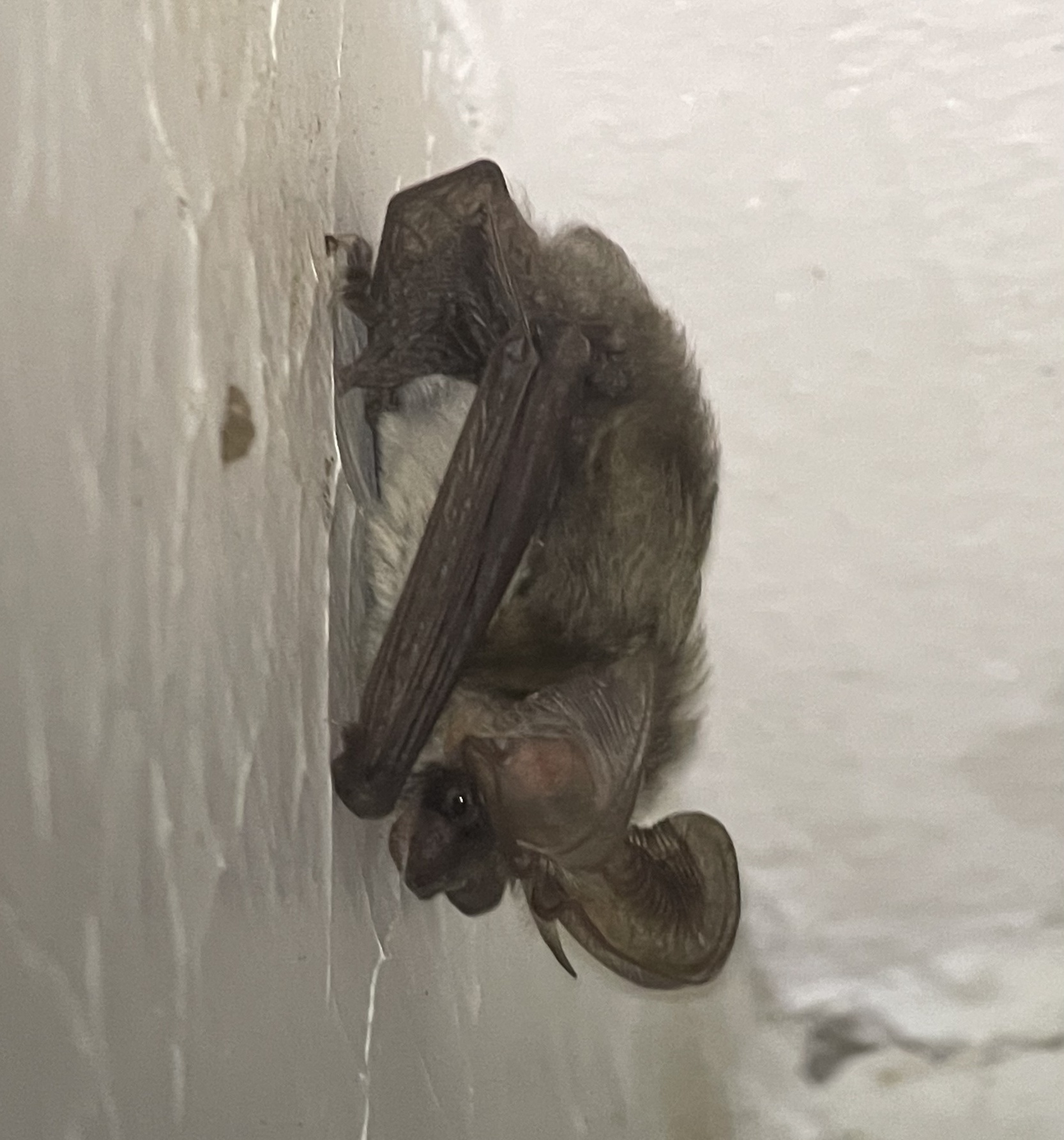
- A Gaisler's long-eared bat in Morocco.

Scientific classification
- Kingdom: Animalia
- Phylum: Chordata
- Class: Mammalia
- Order: Chiroptera
- Family: Vespertilionidae
- Genus: Plecotus
- Species: P. gaisleri

Binomial name
- Plecotus gaisleri Benda, Kiefer, Hanák, & Veith, 2004

= Gaisler's long-eared bat =

Species of bat

Gaisler's long-eared bat (Plecotus gaisleri) is a species of bat in the genus Plecotus. It is a medium-sized grayish-brown and found in Morocco, Algeria, Libya, and Tunisia.

== Taxonomy ==
Plecotus gaisleri was described as a new subspecies of the Canary big-eared bat (P. teneriffae) in 2004 by Petr Benda, who gave it the trinomen of Plecotus teneriffae gaisleri. The holotype had been collected approximately 8 km (5.0 mi) southwest of Massah, Libya in 2002. The eponym for the species name "gaisleri" was Jiří Gaisler, who "significantly contributed to the knowledge of the North African bat fauna". A 2007 study concluded that it should be considered a full species, P. gaisleri, based on the magnitude of genetic divergence.

== Description ==
Plecotus gaisleri is a medium-sized member of its genus, with a forearm length of 37–42 mm (1.5–1.7 in). Individuals weigh approximately 7–10 g (0.25–0.35 oz).

== Biology and ecology ==
It is nocturnal, foraging for its prey at night or shortly before sunset. It mostly consumes large- and medium-sized moths, though also consumes some beetles and flies. Its reproduction is not well known, though it likely has a litter size of one individual, breeds seasonally, and has only one breeding season annually. Its predators include barn owls and Pharaoh eagle-owls.

== Range and habitat ==
Plecotus gaisleri is known from areas of Libya with a Mediterranean climate. In 2004, its known distribution was limited to an area of about 10,000 km^{2} (3,900 mi^{2}), encompassing mountainous and coastal regions. It is now additionally known from Morocco, Algeria, Tunisia, Malta and Italy.
