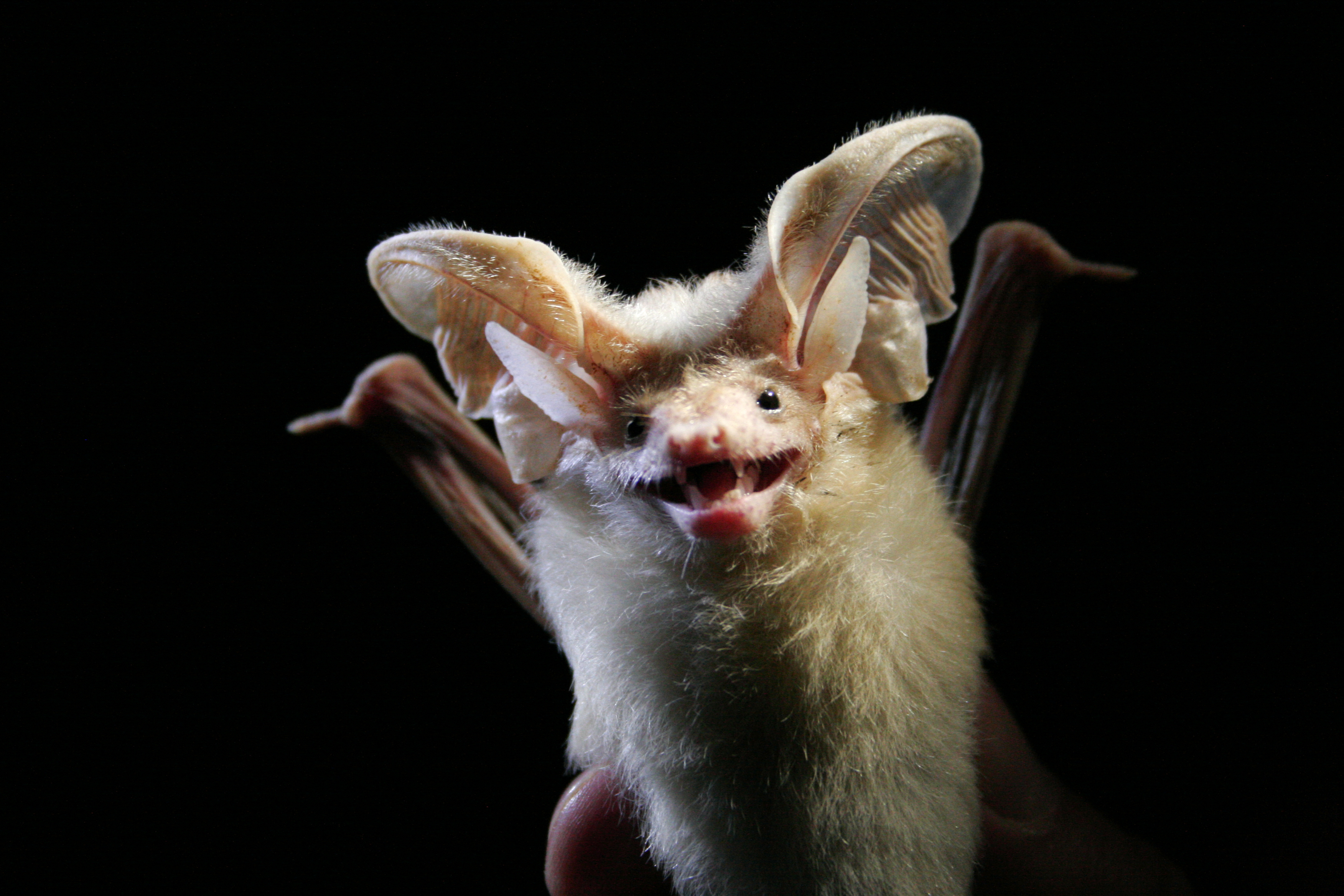
- Desert long-eared bat (Otonycteris hemprichii)

Scientific classification
- Kingdom: Animalia
- Phylum: Chordata
- Class: Mammalia
- Order: Chiroptera
- Family: Vespertilionidae
- Tribe: Plecotini
- Genus: Otonycteris; Peters, 1859

Type species
- Otonycteris hemprichii Peters, 1859

Species
- Otonycteris hemprichii Otonycteris leucophaea

= Otonycteris =

Genus of bats

Otonycteris is a genus of vesper bats. Members of this genus are found in Northern Africa and Central Asia. Until recently, it was thought to be monotypic, but in 2010, the Turkestani long-eared bat was distinguished from the desert long-eared bat; previously, all populations were recognized as the desert long-eared bat.

Currently, it consists of two species:

- Desert long-eared bat (Otonycteris hemprichii)
  - Subspecies
    - Otonycteris hemprichii hemprichii: found in North Africa, the Levant, and the Middle East
    - Otonycteris hemprichii cinerea: found in the mountains of Iran and Oman
    - Otonycteris hemprichii jin: found in low-elevation deserts of the eastern Arabian Peninsula and southeast Iran
- Turkestani long-eared bat (Otonycteris leucophaea)
