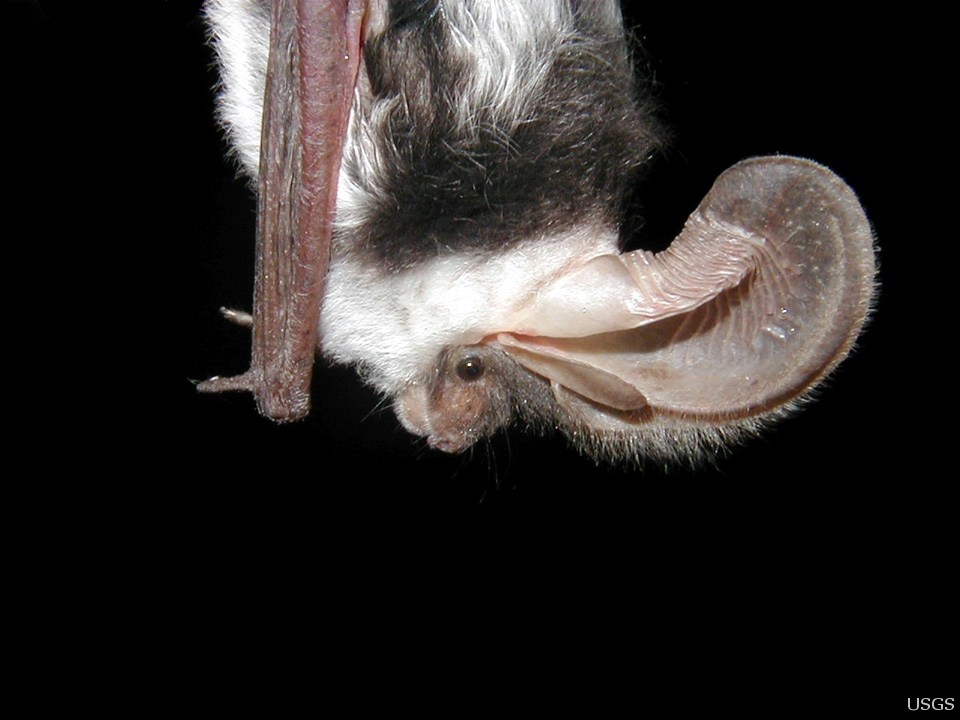
- Side view

Conservation status
- Least Concern (IUCN 3.1)

Scientific classification
- Kingdom: Animalia
- Phylum: Chordata
- Class: Mammalia
- Order: Chiroptera
- Family: Vespertilionidae
- Tribe: Plecotini
- Genus: Euderma; H. Allen, 1892
- Species: E. maculatum

Binomial name
- Euderma maculatum (Allen, 1891)

Synonyms
- Euderma maculata (Allen, 1891); Histiotus maculatus Allen, 1891

= Spotted bat =

Euderma maculatum

Species of mammal

The spotted bat (Euderma maculatum) is a species of vesper bat and the only species of the genus Euderma.

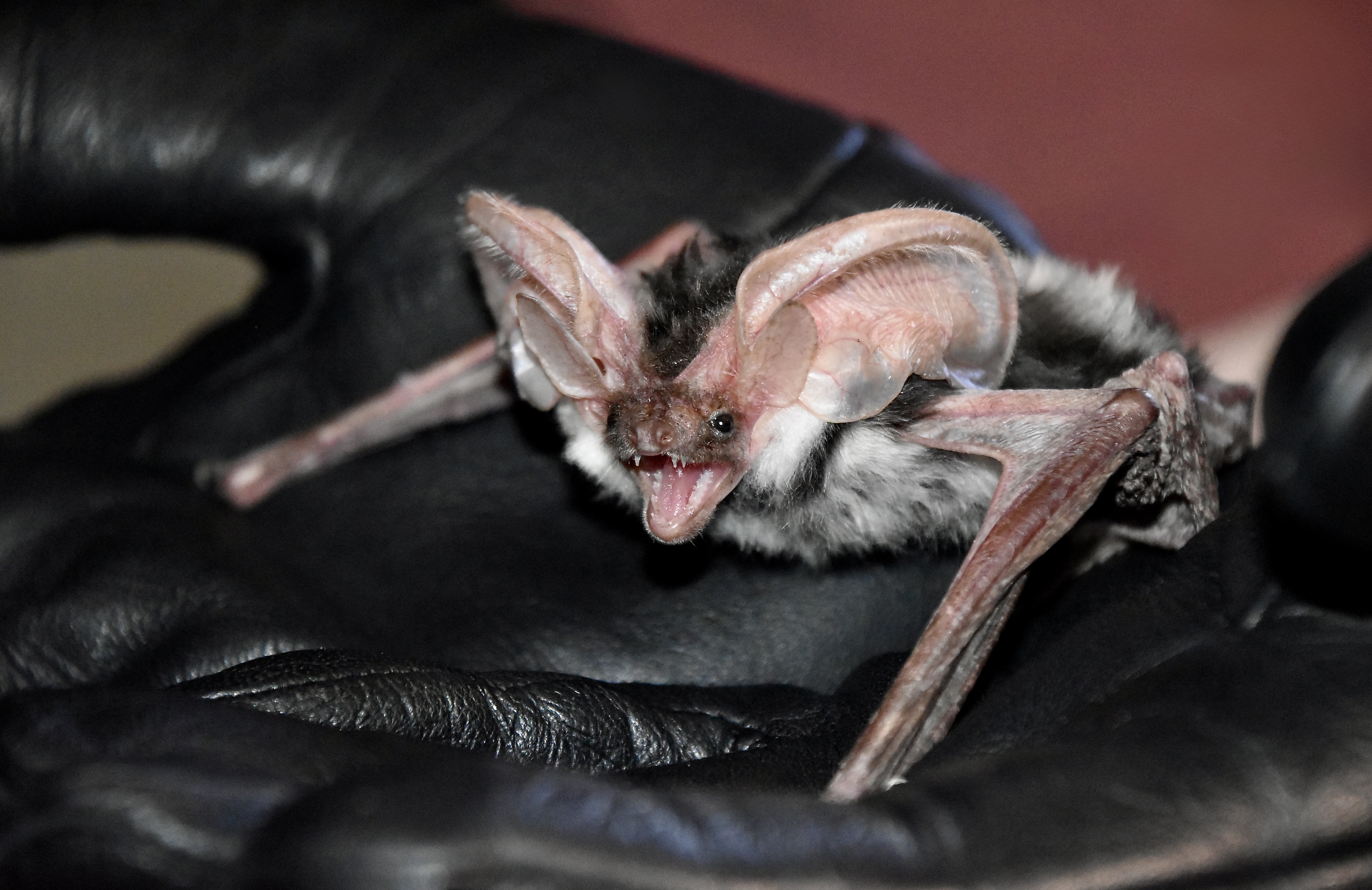
At a bat rescue center in Arizona.

== Description ==
The spotted bat was first described by zoologist Joel Asaph Allen from the American Museum of Natural History in 1891. It can reach a length of 12 cm and a wingspan of 35 cm. The weight is about 15 g. It has three distinctive white spots on its black back. With ears that can grow up to 4 cm, it is said to have the largest ears of any bat species in North America. The spotted bat's mating season is in autumn and the females produce their offspring (usually one juvenile) in June or July. Its main diet is grasshoppers and moths.

== Habitat ==
The habitats of the spotted bat are undisturbed roosts on cliffs along the Grand Canyon in Arizona, and open and dense deciduous and coniferous forests, hay fields, deserts, marshes, riparian areas, and dry shrub-steppe grasslands in Arizona, California, Colorado, Oregon, New Mexico, Utah, Washington, and British Columbia, Canada.

== Threats ==
Use of pesticides such as DDT and other insecticides in the 1960s led to a severe decline in the spotted bat population, but current observations had shown that it is more common than formerly believed. Abundance, population trend, and threats are widely unknown.

== Life ==
Spotted Bats are born during the species mating season (June or July). When these bats are born, they do not have the same color pattern as matured spotted bats. Unlike most other bats, spotted bats are solitary and territorial. During the colder times of the year, some spotted bats migrate to warmer areas. The life span of the spotted bat is not known, but it is assumed to be like others (approximately 20 years).

== See also ==
- Bats of Canada
- Bats of the United States
