= Kozlov's long-eared bat =

Conservation status
- Least Concern (IUCN 3.1)

Scientific classification
- Kingdom: Animalia
- Phylum: Chordata
- Class: Mammalia
- Order: Chiroptera
- Family: Vespertilionidae
- Genus: Plecotus
- Species: P. kozlovi

Binomial name
- Plecotus kozlovi Bobrinski, 1926

Species of vesper bat

Kozlov's long-eared bat (Plecotus kozlovi) is a species of vesper bat in the family Vespertilionidae. It is found in southern Mongolia and adjacent parts of China.

== Taxonomy ==
It was described by Nikolay Alekseyevich Bobrinski in 1926, but was later synonymized with the grey long-eared bat (P. austriacus). However, a 2006 genetic and morphological study found it to be a distinct species and revived it as such. The results of this study have been followed by the American Society of Mammalogists, the IUCN Red List, and the ITIS. Further genetic studies have affirmed it as a distinct species.

== Distribution and habitat ==
It is found in western and southern Mongolia and adjacent parts of China (Inner Mongolia, Xinjiang, and the Qaidam Basin in Qinghai). It is strongly associated with semidesert habitat, primarily steppe-desert. It likely roosts in cliff and rock crevices.

== Status ==
It is not thought to face any major threats at present, so it is classified as Least Concern on the IUCN Red List. However, it may be potentially threatened by commercial mining and agricultural land development.
