= Taiwan long-eared bat =

Taiwan big-eared bat

Conservation status
- Near Threatened (IUCN 3.1)

Scientific classification
- Kingdom: Animalia
- Phylum: Chordata
- Class: Mammalia
- Order: Chiroptera
- Family: Vespertilionidae
- Genus: Plecotus
- Species: P. taivanus

Binomial name
- Plecotus taivanus Yoshiyuki, 1991

Species of bat

The Taiwan long-eared bat (Plecotus taivanus), also known as the Taiwan big-eared bat, is a species of vesper bat in the family Vespertilionidae. It is found only in Taiwan. The Taiwan big-eared bat was described as a new species in 1991 by M. Yoshiyuki.
