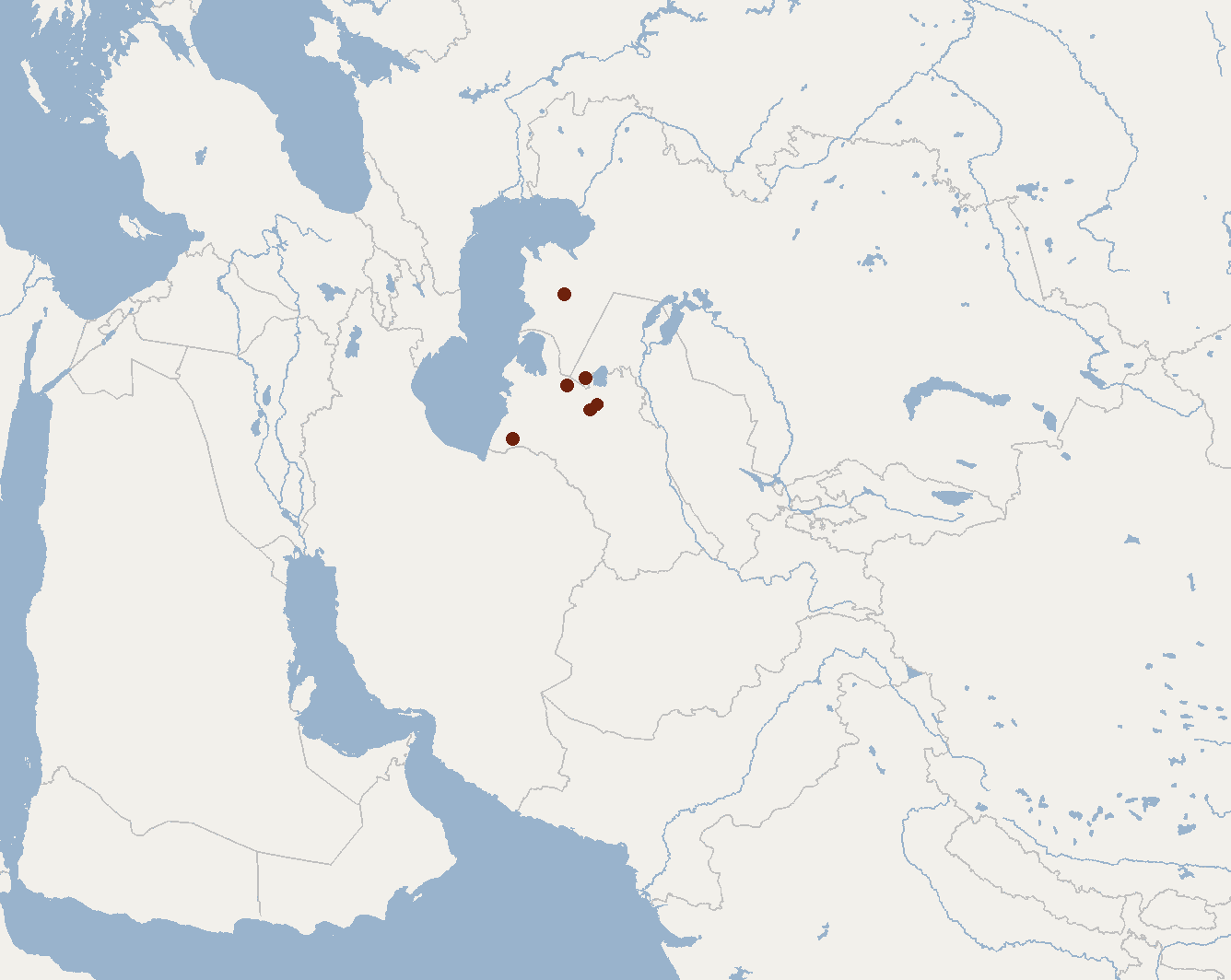
- Geographic distribution of Plecotus turkmenicus

Conservation status
- Least Concern (IUCN 3.1)

Scientific classification
- Kingdom: Animalia
- Phylum: Chordata
- Class: Mammalia
- Order: Chiroptera
- Family: Vespertilionidae
- Genus: Plecotus
- Species: P. turkmenicus

Binomial name
- Plecotus turkmenicus Strelkov, 1988

= Turkmen long-eared bat =

Species of bat

The Turkmen long-eared bat (Plecotus turkmenicus) is a species of bat in the family Vespertilionidae. It is found in Kazakhstan, Uzbekistan and Turkmenistan, and possibly Mongolia.

It has been assessed by the IUCN as least concern.

== Taxonomy ==
P. turkmenicus was considered a synonym or subspecies of P. austriacus by Strelkov. It was raised to species status in 2006 by Spitzenberger.

== Distribution and status ==
P. turkmenicus is found in the northwestern part of Karakum desert in Turkmenistan and the western Ustyurt plateau and Mangyshlak in Kazakhstan. It is found in temperate deserts. The bats roost in natural caves and wells.

P. turkmenicus has been assessed as least concern by the IUCN due to its large range and population, and lack of significant population decline. The bat occurs in a few protected areas across its range.
