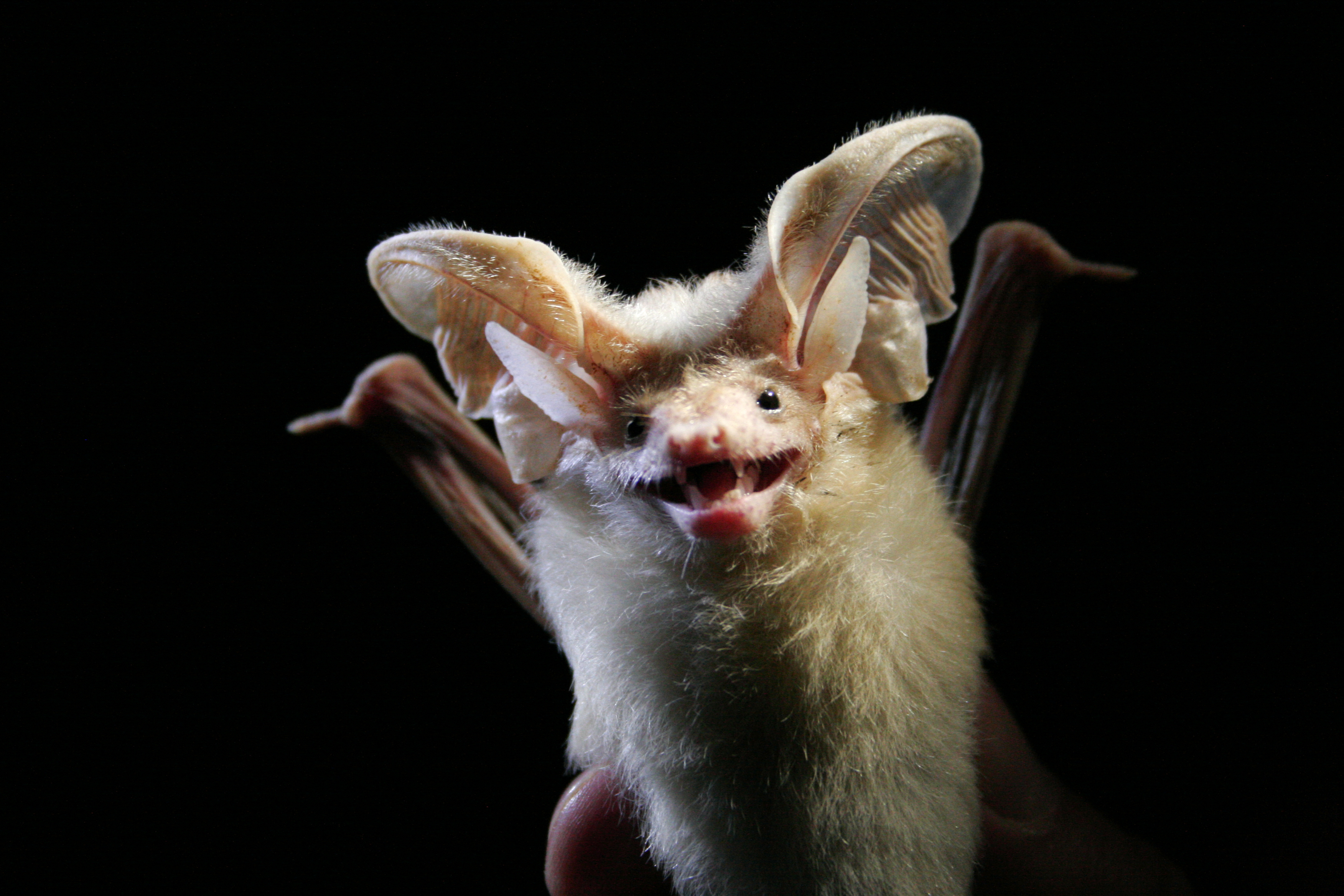

Conservation status
- Least Concern (IUCN 3.1)

Scientific classification
- Kingdom: Animalia
- Phylum: Chordata
- Class: Mammalia
- Infraclass: Placentalia
- Order: Chiroptera
- Family: Vespertilionidae
- Genus: Otonycteris
- Species: O. hemprichii

Binomial name
- Otonycteris hemprichii Peters, 1859

= Desert long-eared bat =

Species of bat

The desert long-eared bat (Otonycteris hemprichii) is a species of vesper bat found in North Africa and the Middle East.

== Taxonomy ==
The taxonomic classification of Otonycteris is unclear, however their chromosomes suggest that this genus is closely related to the Barbastella and Plecotus genera.

== Description ==
It has a body and head length of about 73–81 mm (2.9-3.2 in); a forearm length of about 57–67 mm (2.2–2.6 in), and a tail length of about 47–70 mm (1.9–2.8 in). Male desert long-eared bats weigh 18–20 g (0.63–0.71 oz). They have nearly horizontally directed ears, which use a band of skin to connect across the forehead and are about 40 mm in length. The desert long-eared bat has a pale sandy and dark brown upper part, with a whitish bottom. It has a similar skull and similar teeth to the Eptesicus. Some specimens of this species have two sets of mammae in their pectoral muscles, which is unique for mammals. These mammae may not be functional.

== Ecology and behavior ==
This species normally inhabits dry, arid, rocky, and barren regions. One pair of these bats was found living in a hill's crevice in the Negev Desert. This bat has also been found in buildings.

Otonycteris hemprichii has a flight pattern described as "floppy and slow".

=== Diet ===
This species is assumed to be carnivorous due to its body mass, low wing loading, and low aspect ratio. This bat likely forages close to the ground, using echolocation to detect large flying or surface-dwelling invertebrates. Through echolocation, the bats can detect scorpions as they walk. They feed mostly on arachnids and orthopterans that are seized directly from the ground. An Israeli study found that up to 70% of the bat droppings contained scorpion fragments, including the highly venomous Palestine yellow scorpion along with other less venomous species. The bat catches the scorpion, biting its head off. The bats are often stung in the face with the scorpion's stinger with no recorded signs of toxicity, suggesting that the bats are immune to the venom.

=== Courtship and breeding ===
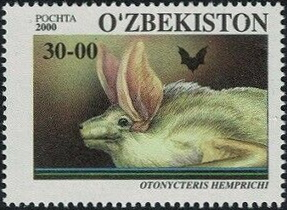
Otonycteris hemprichii on a 2001 stamp of Uzbekistan

Breeding colonies consisting of 3–15 females have been discovered. Seven pregnant females, most with two embryos, were found in central Asia. In a deserted hut in Jordan three pregnant females, all of whom carried two embryos were found.

== Distribution and range ==
Its range is now recognized to include Afghanistan, Algeria, Egypt, India, Iran, Israel, Jordan, Kazakhstan, Libya, Morocco, Niger, Oman, Pakistan, Palestine, Qatar, Saudi Arabia, Sudan, Syrian Arab Republic, Tajikistan, Tunisia, Turkey, Turkmenistan, United Arab Emirates, and Uzbekistan.
