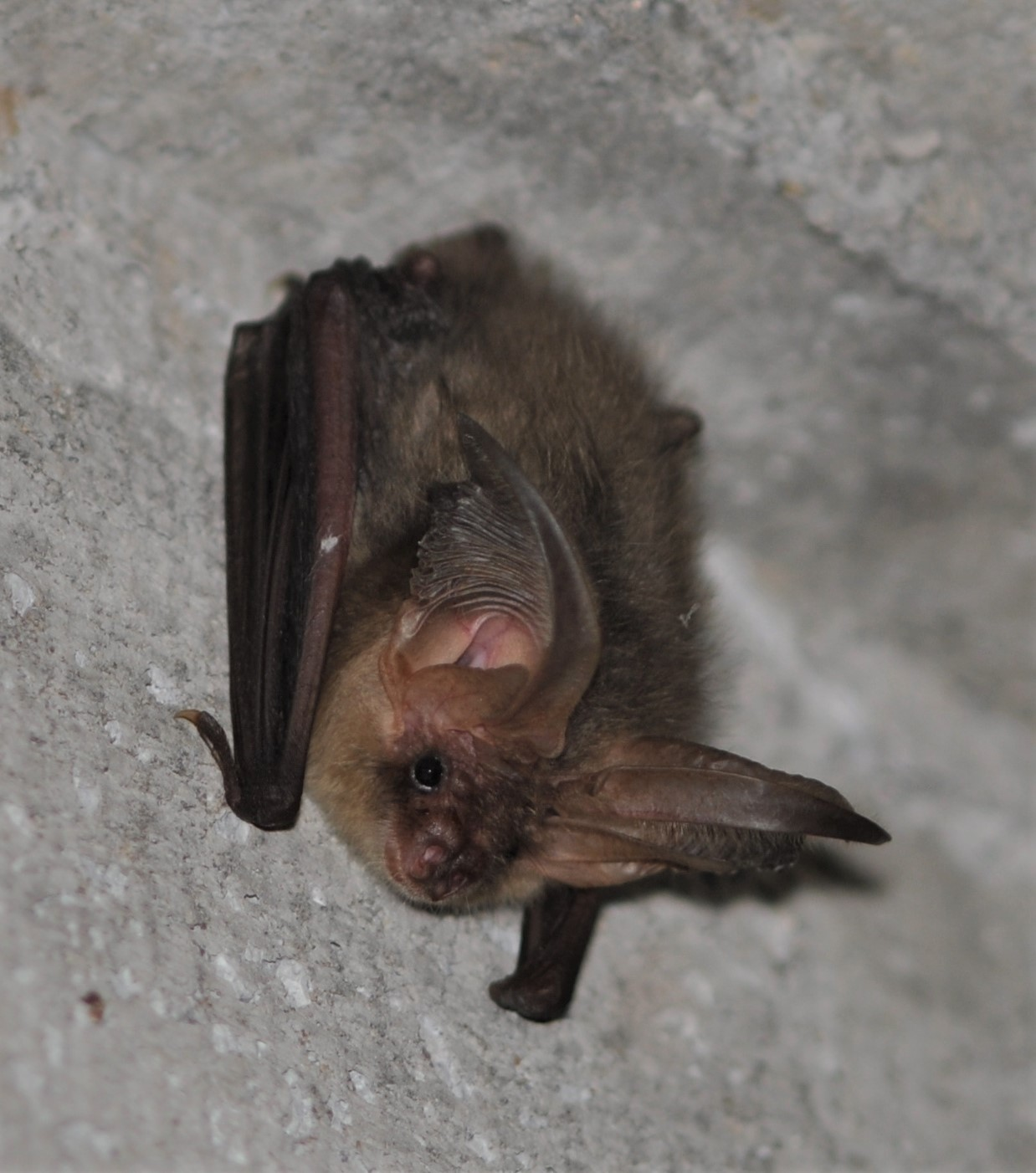
- Brown long-eared bat (Plecotus auritus)

Scientific classification
- Domain: Eukaryota
- Kingdom: Animalia
- Phylum: Chordata
- Class: Mammalia
- Order: Chiroptera
- Family: Vespertilionidae
- Tribe: Plecotini
- Genus: Plecotus; E. Geoffroy, 1818

Type species
- Vespertilio auritus Linnaeus, 1758

Species
- See text

= Plecotus =

Genus of bats

Plecotus is a genus of vesper bat, commonly called long-eared bats. They are found throughout Eurasia and northern Africa. Many species in the genus have only been described and recognized in recent years.

== Species ==
Genus Plecotus – long-eared bats

- Brown long-eared bat, Plecotus auritus
- Grey long-eared bat, Plecotus austriacus
- Ethiopian long-eared bat, Plecotus balensis
- Christie's long-eared bat, Plecotus christii
- Gaisler's long-eared bat, Plecotus gaisleri
- Himalayan long-eared bat, Plecotus homochrous
- Mediterranean long-eared bat, Plecotus kolombatovici
- Kozlov's long-eared bat, Plecotus kozlovi
- Alpine long-eared bat, Plecotus macrobullaris
- Ognev's long-eared bat Plecotus ognevi
- Japanese long-eared bat, Plecotus sacrimontis
- Sardinian long-eared bat, Plecotus sardus
- Strelkov's long-eared bat, Plecotus strelkovi
- Taiwan long-eared bat, Plecotus taivanus
- Canary long-eared bat, Plecotus teneriffae
- Turkmen long-eared bat, Plecotus turkmenicus
- Ward's long-eared bat, Plecotus wardi
