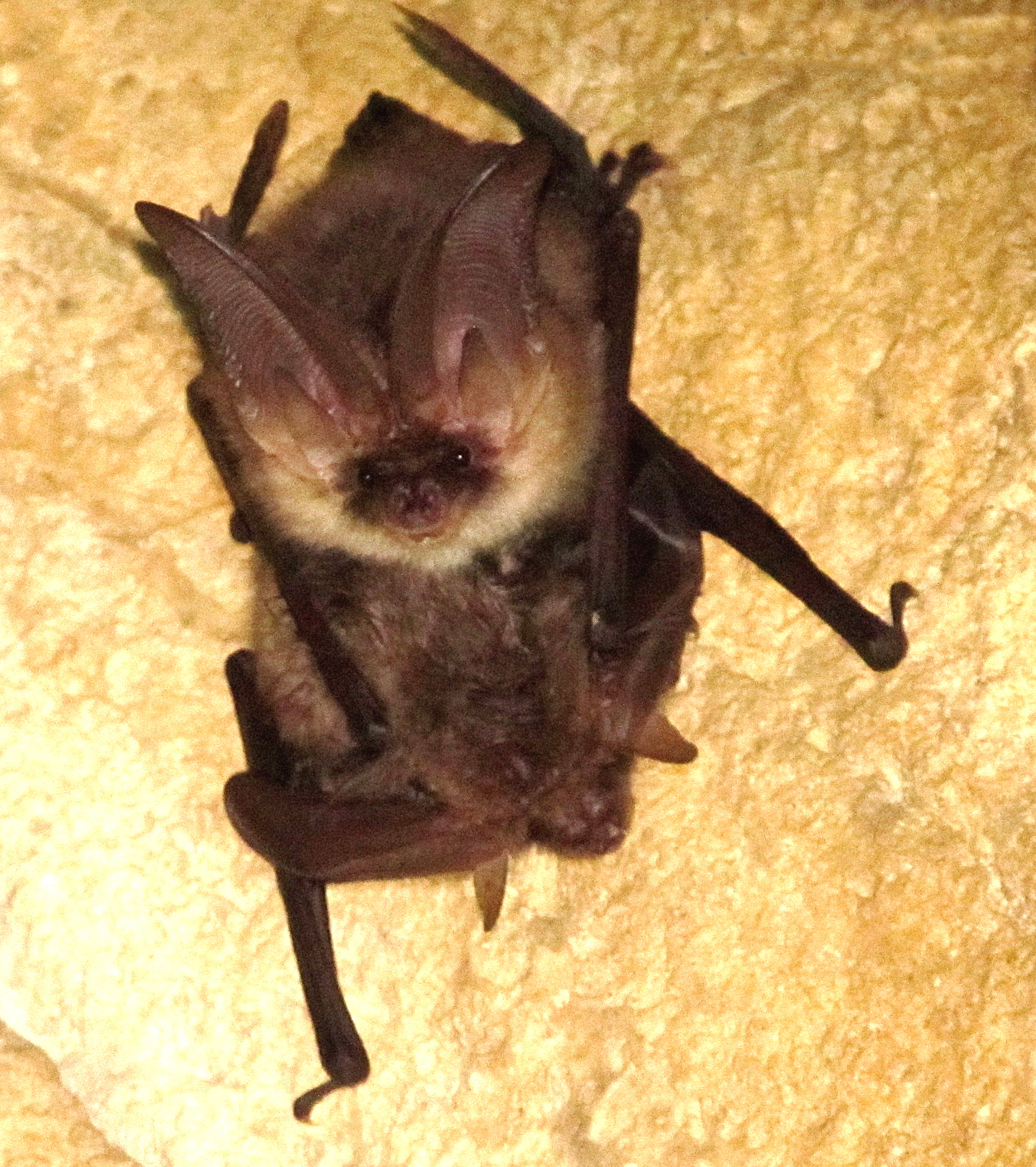

Conservation status
- Least Concern (IUCN 3.1)

Scientific classification
- Kingdom: Animalia
- Phylum: Chordata
- Class: Mammalia
- Order: Chiroptera
- Family: Vespertilionidae
- Genus: Plecotus
- Species: P. ognevi

Binomial name
- Plecotus ognevi Kishida, 1927

= Ognev's long-eared bat =

Species of bat

Ognev's long-eared bat (Plecotus ognevi) is a species of bat found in Asia. By 2006, it was recognized as a separate species from the P. auritus species complex.

== Range and habitat ==
Ognev's long-eared bat was recorded in the following countries : China, Kazakhstan, South-Korea, North Korea, Mongolia and Russia. It was recorded in habitats such as the taiga and Southern Siberian mountain forests as well as temperate mixed and temperate deciduous forests.
