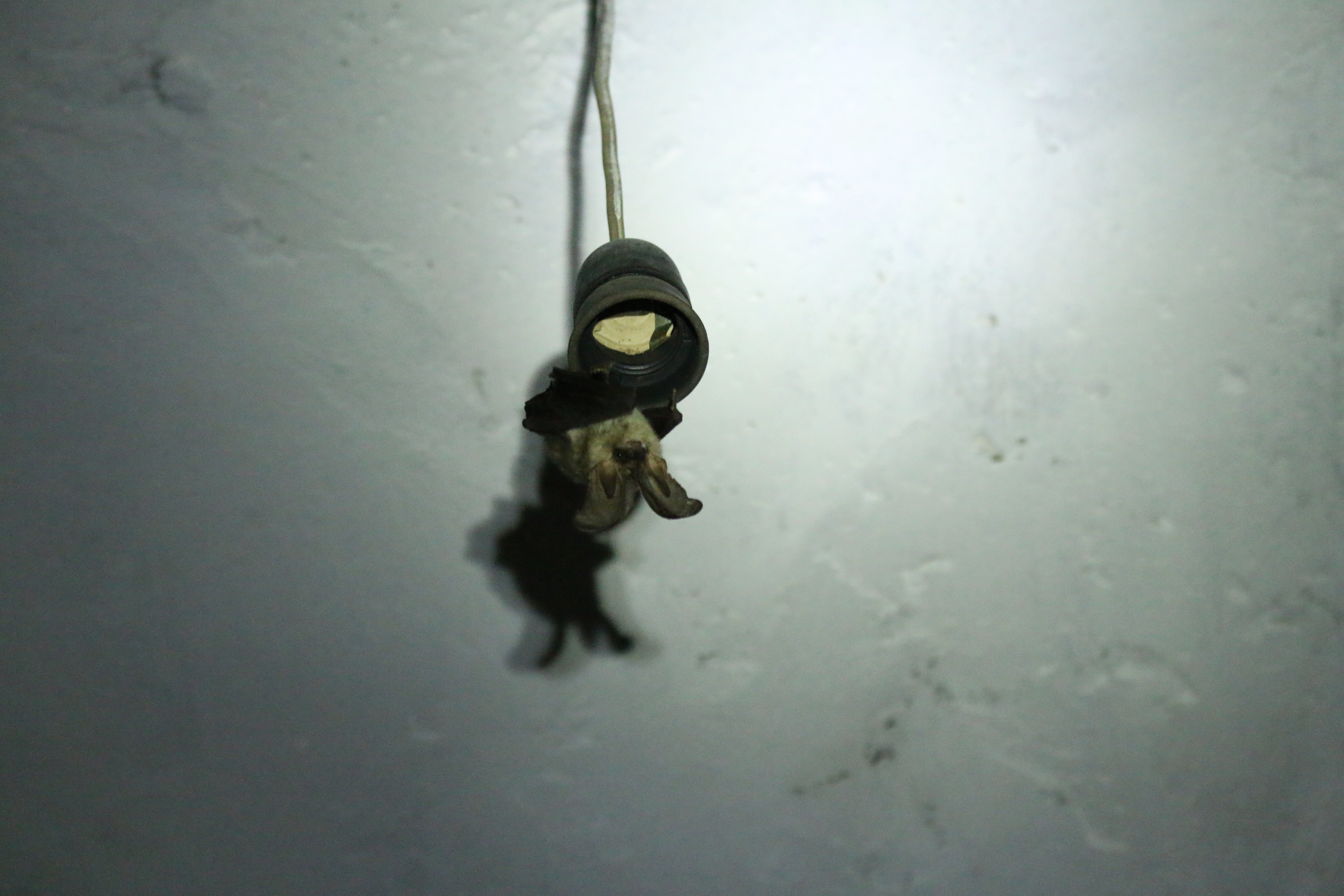

Conservation status
- Least Concern (IUCN 3.1)

Scientific classification
- Kingdom: Animalia
- Phylum: Chordata
- Class: Mammalia
- Order: Chiroptera
- Family: Vespertilionidae
- Genus: Plecotus
- Species: P. kolombatovici

Binomial name
- Plecotus kolombatovici Dulic, 1980

= Mediterranean long-eared bat =

Species of bat

The Mediterranean long-eared bat (Plecotus kolombatovici), also known as Kolombatovic's long-eared bat or the Balkan long-eared bat, is a species of vesper bat ranging from Italy east through the Balkans east to Syria, and south to Jordan.

== Taxonomy ==
The species was described by Dulić in 1980, following the identification of small bats from the Plecotus genus in Croatia. However, until 2010, the qualification of P.kolombatovici as species was subject to doubt. Specimens of Plecotus sp. were analysed in North Africa, the Canary Islands, and Asia over a period of years, and it was proposed that all the specimens were subspecies of the same species, Plecotus teneriffae. However, the most recent studies confirm the status of species for P. kolombatovici. As several species of Plecotus can be leaving in sympatry in a same region, a clear identification of specimen can be very difficult.

== Distribution ==
So far, P. kolombatovici has been recorded in Albania, Croatia and Greece, as well as Italy and parts of the Middle East.

This species is often found in the islands of the Adriatic sea, but also inland with a recorded presence in most of Greece. In Albania, many specimens were found in former bunkers on the Sazan Island.
