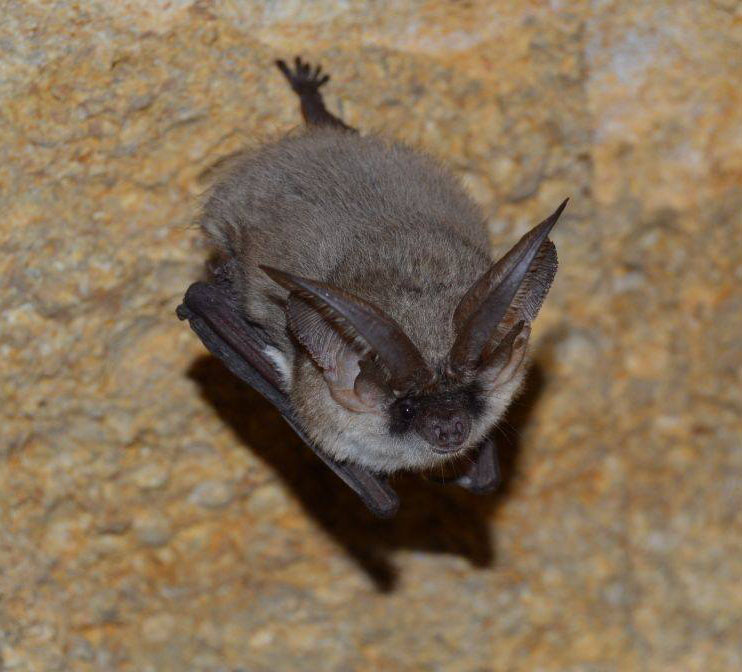

Conservation status
- Near Threatened (IUCN 3.1)

Scientific classification
- Kingdom: Animalia
- Phylum: Chordata
- Class: Mammalia
- Order: Chiroptera
- Family: Vespertilionidae
- Genus: Plecotus
- Species: P. austriacus

Binomial name
- Plecotus austriacus (J.B. Fischer, 1829)
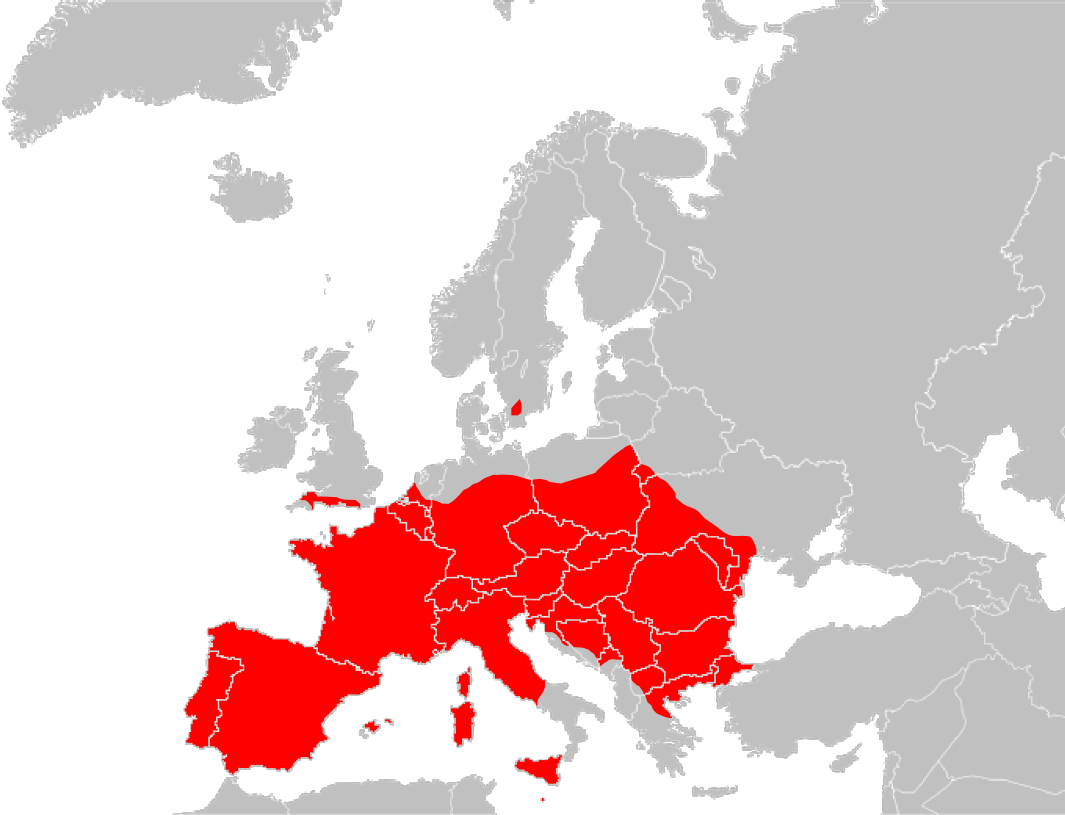
- Range of P. austriacus

= Grey long-eared bat =

Grey long-eared Bat

Species of bat

The grey long-eared bat (Plecotus austriacus) is a fairly large European bat. It has distinctive ears, long and with a distinctive fold. It hunts above woodland, often by day, and mostly for moths. In captivity, it has also been recorded to eat small lizards. It is extremely similar to the more common brown long-eared bat, and was only distinguished in the 1960s, but has a paler belly.

== Biology and ecology ==
Its main foraging habitats are lowland meadows and marshes. It locates its insect prey via echolocation. The frequencies used by this bat species for echolocation lie between 18 and 45 kHz, have most energy at 28 kHz and have an average duration of 5.8 ms.

== Distribution ==
Distributed throughout all of Europe, except for the Scandinavian Peninsula. Although they are a near threatened species, they are more commonly found in Southern Europe. (To be more specific, woodlands and grasslands, as well as a few urban areas.)

== Conservation ==
It is currently listed as near-threatened by the IUCN. It has a large geographic range and it is considered relatively common. In most of the countries where it is found, it is protected from intentional harm by legislation. While Continental European distributions are not threatened, a 2013 study found this species was close to extinction in the United Kingdom.

One possible reason for its decline in the UK is the loss of foraging habitat. It is currently a focus within the Back from the Brink conservation project which aims to increase foraging habitat around known roost sites. This species may also be threatened by climate change in Southern Europe.

One researcher noted, "long-lived, slow-reproducing species with smaller population sizes are not likely to be able to adapt to future climate change fast enough through the spread of new mutations arising in the population." In the future, it may be necessary for humans to relocate bats to suitable areas as climate changes.
