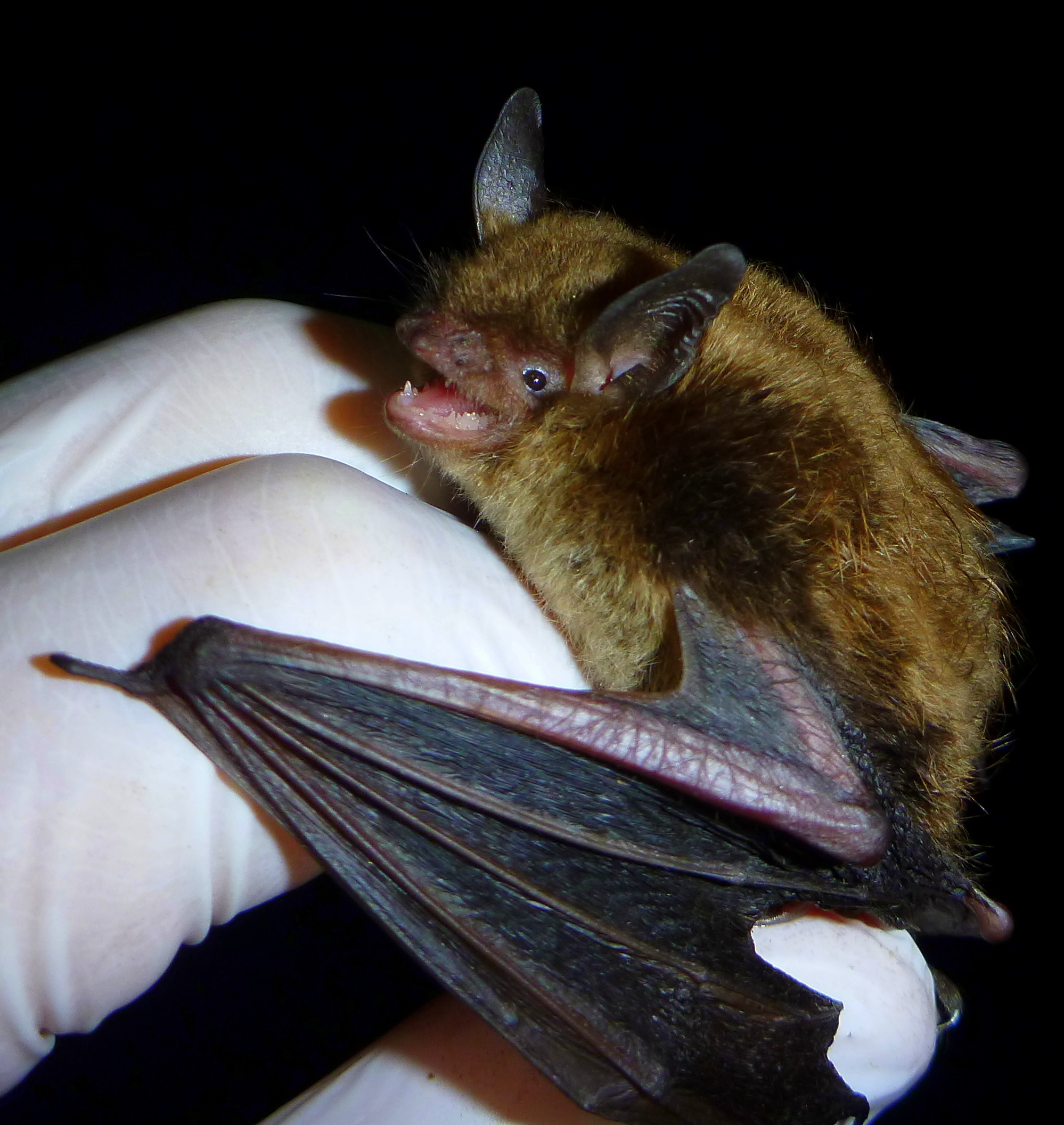

Conservation status
- Endangered (IUCN 3.1)

Scientific classification
- Kingdom: Animalia
- Phylum: Chordata
- Class: Mammalia
- Order: Chiroptera
- Family: Vespertilionidae
- Genus: Myotis
- Species: M. lucifugus

Binomial name
- Myotis lucifugus (Le Conte, 1831)

Subspecies
- Myotis lucifugus pernox; Myotis lucifugus lucifugus; Myotis lucifugus alascensis; Myotis lucifugus carissima; Myotis lucifugus relictus
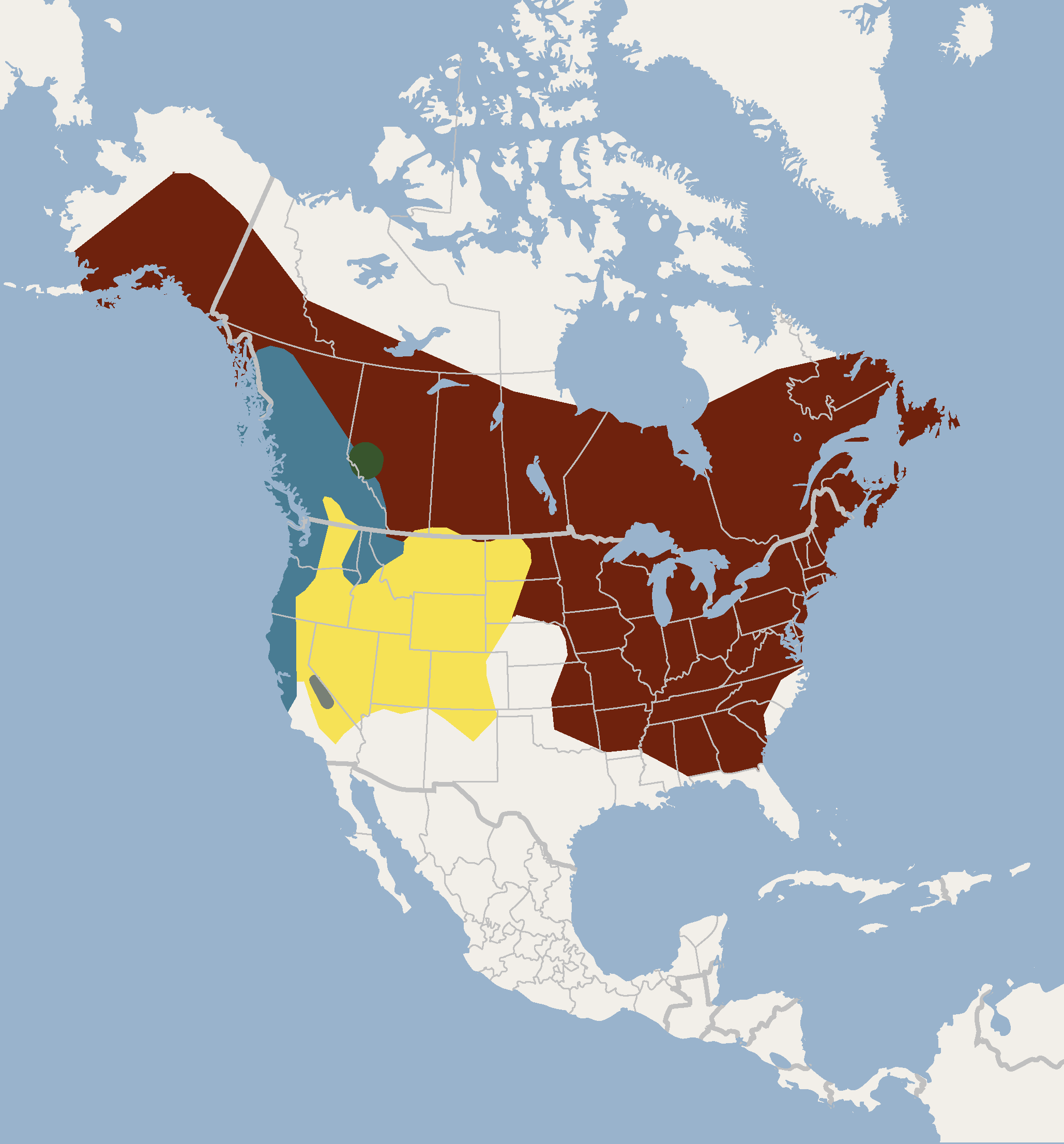
- Distribution of all little brown bat subspecies: M. l. lucifugus (red), M. l. pernox (green), M. l. alascensis (blue), M. l. carissima (yellow), M. l. relictus (gray)

Synonyms
- Vespertilio lucifugus Le Conte, 1831

= Little brown bat =

Species of mammal found in North America

The little brown bat or little brown myotis (Myotis lucifugus) is an endangered species of mouse-eared microbat found in North America. It has a small body size and glossy brown fur. It is similar in appearance to several other mouse-eared bats, including the Indiana bat, northern long-eared bat, and Arizona myotis, to which it is closely related. Despite its name, the little brown bat is not closely related to the big brown bat, which belongs to a different genus.

Its mating system is polygynandrous, or promiscuous, and females give birth to one offspring annually. The offspring, called pups, are quickly weaned and reach adult size in some dimensions by three weeks old. The little brown bat has a lifespan of 34-35 years. It is nocturnal, foraging for its insect prey at night and roosting in hollow trees or buildings during the day, among less common roost types. It navigates and locates prey with echolocation.

It has few natural predators, but may be killed by raptors such as owls, as well as terrestrial predators such as raccoons. Other sources of mortality include diseases such as rabies and white-nose syndrome. White-nose syndrome has been a significant cause of mortality since 2006, killing over one million little brown bats by 2011. In the Northeastern United States, population loss has been extreme, with surveyed hibernacula (caves used for hibernation) averaging a population loss of 90%.

Humans frequently encounter the little brown bat due to its habit of roosting in buildings. Colonies in buildings are often considered pests because of the production of waste or the concern of rabies transmission. Little brown bats rarely test positive for rabies, however. Some people attempt to attract little brown bats to their property, but not their houses, by installing bat houses.

== Taxonomy ==
- - Old World spp.
  - - Nearctic spp.
      - - M. californicus
        - M. leibii
      - - - M. septentrionalis
          - M. auriculus
        - - - M. sodalis
            - M. volans
          - - - M. lucifugus
              - M. occultus
            - - M. thysanodes
              - - M. evotis
                - M. keenii

Relationships of Nearctic Myotis species

The little brown bat was described as a new species in 1831 by American naturalist John Eatton Le Conte. It was initially in the genus Vespertilio, with a binomial of Vespertilio lucifugus, before it was re-categorized as belonging to the Myotis genus. "Myotis" is a Neo-Latin construction, from the Greek "muós (meaning "mouse") and "oûs" (meaning ear), literally translating to "mouse-eared". "Lucifugus" is from Latin "lux" (meaning "light") and "fugere" (meaning "to shun"), literally translating to "light-shunning". The holotype had possibly been collected in Georgia near the Le Conte Plantation near Riceboro, but this has been disputed because the initial record lacked detail on where the specimen was collected.

Within its family, the Vespertilionidae (vesper bats), the little brown bat is a member of the subfamily Myotinae, which contains only the mouse-eared bats of genus Myotis. Based on a 2007 study using mitochondrial and nuclear DNA, it is part of a Nearctic clade of mouse-eared bats. Its sister taxon is the Arizona myotis, M. occultus.

As of 2005, five subspecies of the little brown bat are recognized: M. l. lucifugus, M. l. alascensis, M. l. carissima, M. l. pernox, and M. l. relictus. Formerly, the Arizona myotis and southeastern myotis (M. austroriparius) were also considered subspecies (M. l. occultus and M. l. austroriparius), but both are now recognized as full species. In a 2018 study by Morales and Carstens, they concluded that the five subspecies are independent, paraphyletic lineages, meaning that grouping them together excludes other lineages with the same common ancestor, and therefore each warrant specific status.

Results of one study suggested that the little brown bat can hybridize with Yuma myotis, M. yumanensis. The two species occur in the same area in much of the Western United States, as well as southern British Columbia. The two species are morphologically different throughout most of the range, but in some regions, individuals have been documented that are intermediate in appearance between the two. However, a 1983 study by Herd and Fenton found no morphological, genetic, or ecological evidence to support the notion that the two species hybridize.

== Anatomy and physiology ==
=== External characteristics ===
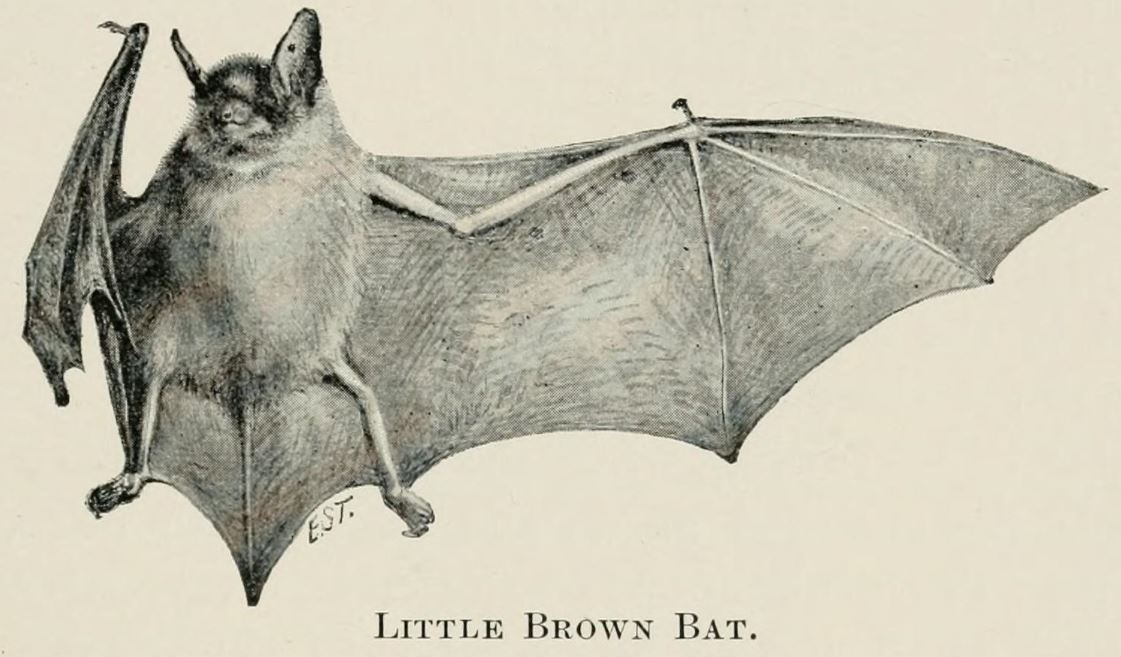
Illustration of the little brown bat

The little brown bat is a small species, with individuals weighing 5.5–12.5 g (0.19–0.44 oz) with a total body length of 8.0–9.5 cm (3.1–3.7 in). Individuals have the lowest weight in the spring as they emerge from hibernation. It has a forearm length of 36–40 mm (1.4–1.6 in) and a wingspan of 22.2–26.9 cm (8.7–10.6 in). It is a sexually dimorphic species, with females larger than males on average. A variety of fur colors is possible, with pelage ranging from pale tan or reddish to dark brown. Its belly fur is a lighter color than its back fur. Its fur is glossy in appearance, though less so on its belly. A variety of pigmentation disorders have been documented in this species, including albinism (total lack of pigment), leucism (partial lack of pigment), and melanism (over-pigmentation).

=== Head and teeth ===
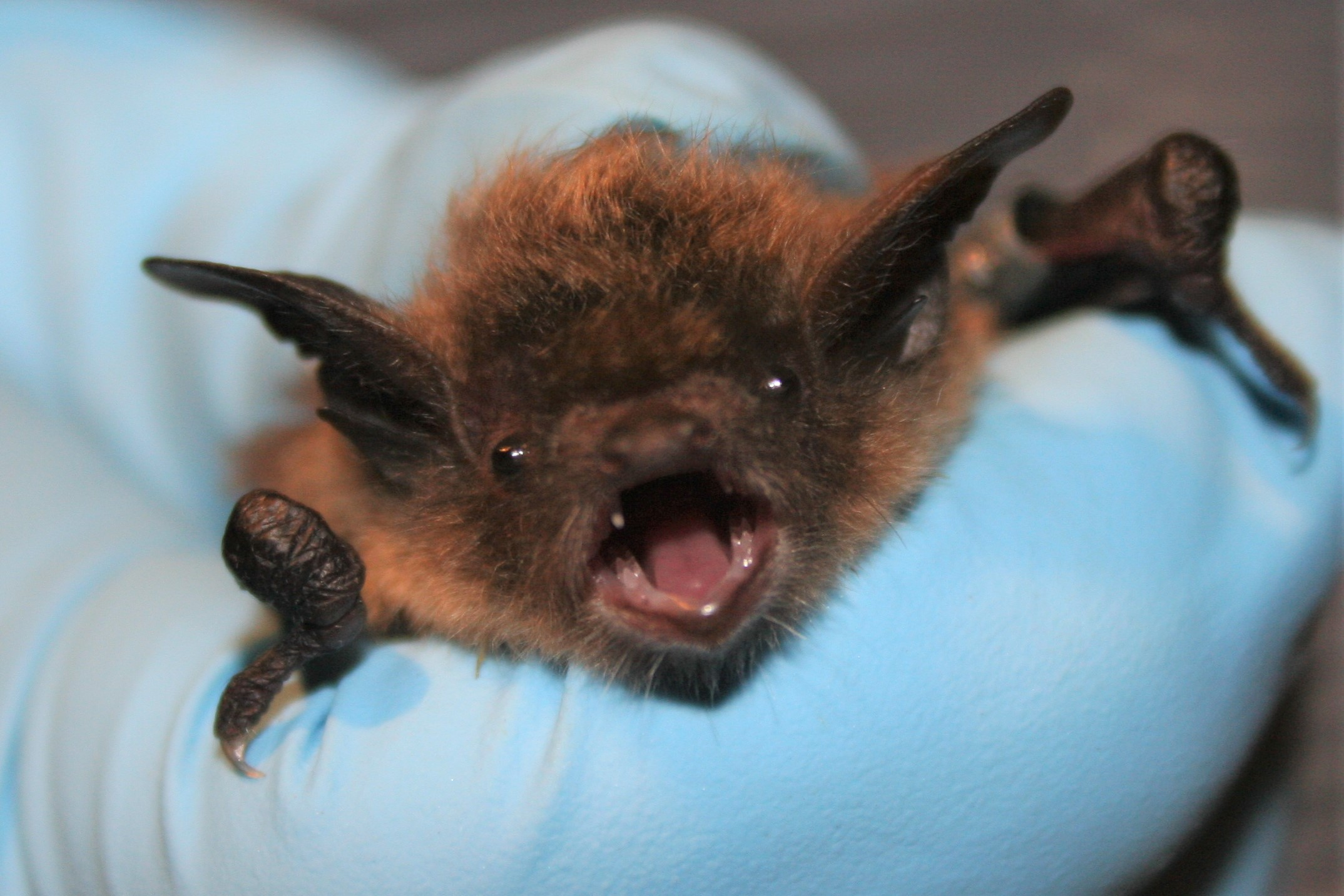
Face of the little brown bat

It is a diphyodont mammal, meaning that it has two sets of teeth during its lifetime—milk teeth and adult teeth. The dental formula of the milk teeth is 2.1.2.03.1.2.0 for a total of 22 teeth, while that of the adult teeth is 2.1.3.33.1.3.3 for a total of 38 teeth. Newborns ("pups") are born with 20 milk teeth which becomes 22 when the final upper premolars emerge. Pups begin losing milk teeth once they have reached a body length of 55–60 mm (2.2–2.4 in); total loss of milk teeth and emergence of adult teeth is usually complete by the time a juvenile is 80 mm (3.1 in) long.

It has a relatively short snout and a gently sloped forehead. It lacks a sagittal crest, which can be used to distinguish it from the Arizona myotis. Its skull length is 14–16 mm (0.55–0.63 in). The braincase appears nearly circular though somewhat flattened when viewed from the back. Its ears are 11.0–15.5 mm (0.43–0.61 in) long, while the tragi, or cartilaginous flaps that project in front of the ear openings, are 7.0–9.0 mm (0.28–0.35 in) long. The tragi are blunt at the tips and considered of medium length for a mouse-eared bat.

=== Senses ===
The little brown bat is dichromatic and its eyesight is likely sensitive to ultraviolet and red light, based on a genetic analysis that discovered that the genes SWS1 and M/LWS were present and functional. Its ability to see ultraviolet light may be useful in capturing insects, as 80% of nocturnal moths' wings reflect UV light. It is unclear if or how seeing red light is advantageous for this species. It is adapted to see best in low-light conditions. It lacks eyeshine.

The little brown bat lacks a vomeronasal organ. Relative to frugivorous bat species such as the Jamaican fruit bat, it has small eyes and a reduced olfactory epithelium. Instead, it has a more sophisticated system of echolocation, suggesting that reliance on echolocation decreases the need for orientation via sight or smell.

=== Physiology ===
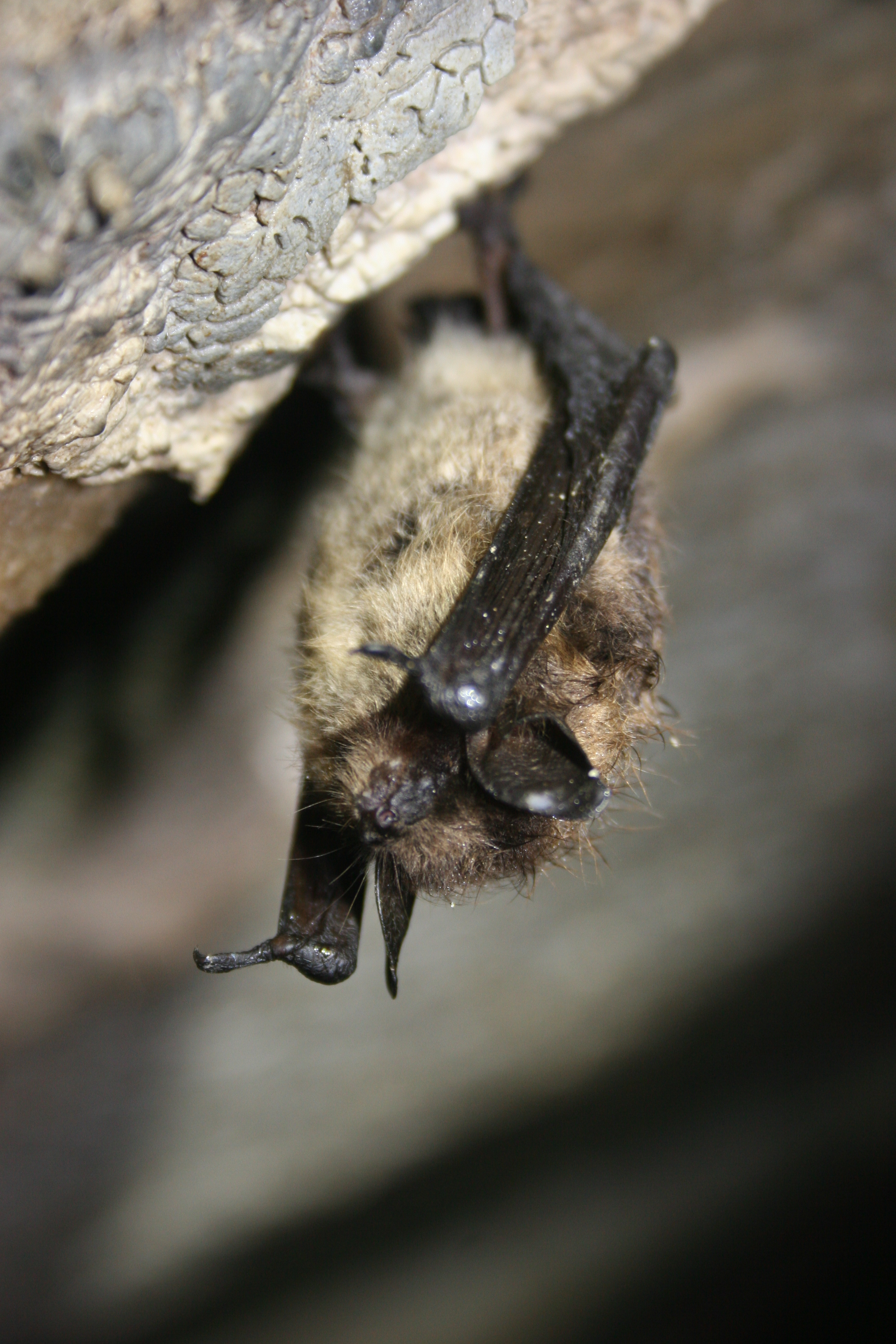
Little brown bat during winter hibernation

In fall through spring, the little brown bat enters torpor, a state of decreased physiological activity, daily. Torpor saves energy for the bat when ambient temperatures are below 39 °F (4 °C) throughout the year and 32 °F (0 °C) in the winter; instead of expending energy to maintain a constant body temperature, it allows its body to cool and physiological activity to slow. While in torpor, its heart rate drops from up to 210 beats per minute to as few as 8 beats per minute. The exception to this rule is females at the end of pregnancy, which no longer have the ability to thermoregulate, and therefore must roost in warm places. During daily roosting, it can cope with high levels of water loss of up to 25%.

In the winter time, it enters a prolonged state of torpor known as hibernation. To conserve energy, it limits how frequently it arouses from torpor, with individuals existing in uninterrupted torpor for up to 90 days. Arousal is the most energetically costly phase of torpor, which is why individuals do so infrequently. Despite the energy-saving mechanism of hibernation, individuals lose a quarter of their pre-hibernation body mass during the winter.

=== Similar species ===
The little brown bat can be confused with the Indiana bat (M. sodalis) in appearance. The two can be differentiated by the little brown bat's lack of a keeled calcar—the cartilaginous spur on its uropatagium (the flight membrane between its hind legs). While it does have a calcar, that of the little brown bat is not nearly as pronounced. Additionally, the little brown bat can be distinguished by the presence of hairs on its toes and feet that extend beyond the length of the digits. The northern long-eared bat (M. septentrionalis), another similar species, can be distinguished by its much longer ears, and tragi that are long and sharply pointed.

== Biology and ecology ==
=== Reproduction and life cycle ===
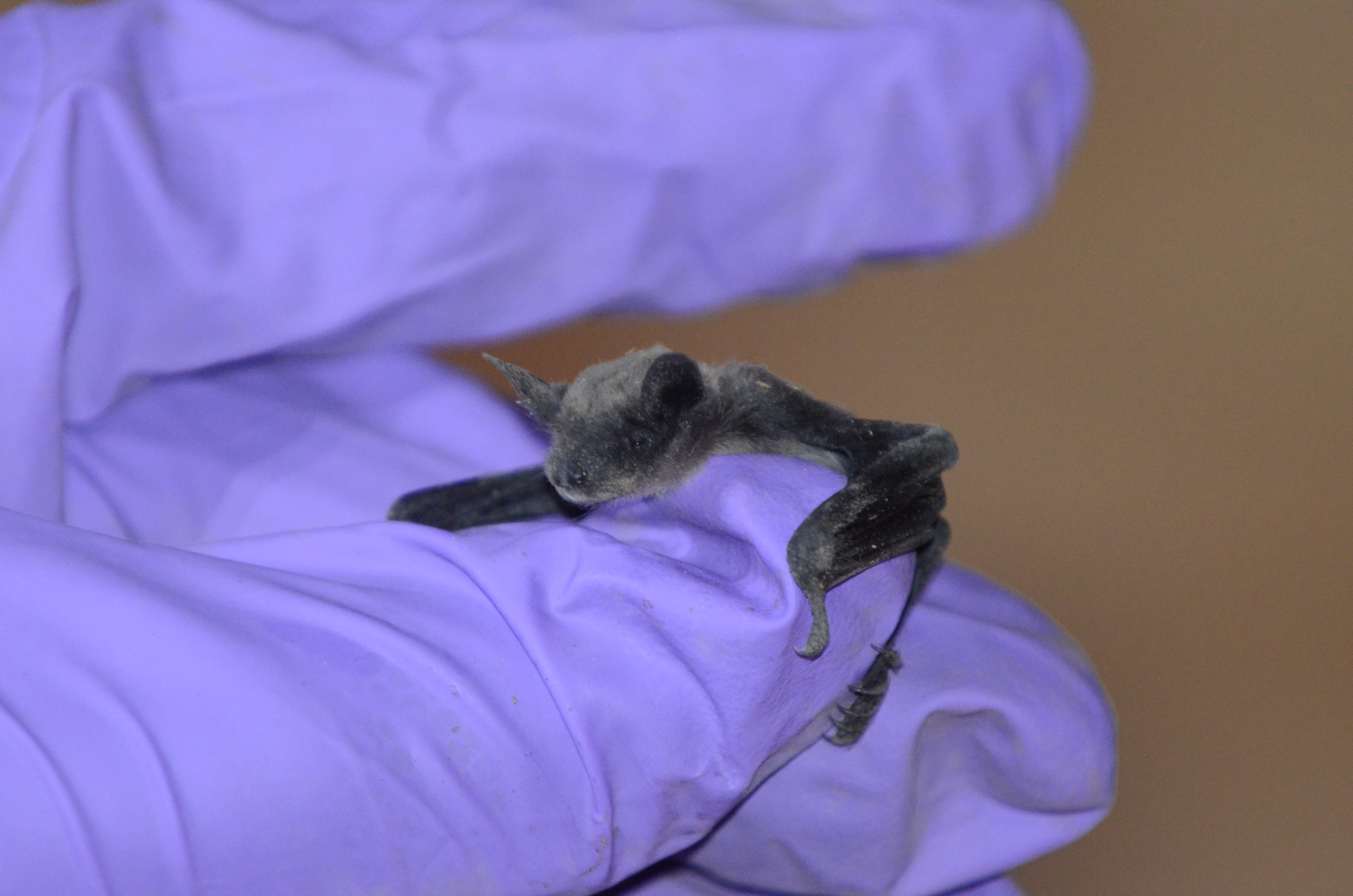
Recently born little brown myotis in maternity colony within Yellowstone National Park

The little brown bat has a promiscuous mating structure, meaning that individual bats of both sexes mate with multiple partners. It is a seasonal breeder, with mating taking place in the fall before the annual hibernation. As a seasonal breeder, males do not produce sperm year-round; instead, spermatogenesis occurs May through August each year. Throughout the spring and summer, males and females roost separately. In the fall, however, individuals of both sexes will congregate in the same roost in a behavior known as "swarming". Like several other bat species, males of this species exhibit homosexual behaviors, with male bats mating indiscriminately with torpid, roosting bats, regardless of sex.

Although copulation occurs in the fall, fertilization does not occur until the spring due to sperm storage. Gestation proceeds for 50–60 days following fertilization. The litter size is one individual. At birth, pups weigh approximately 2.2 g (0.078 oz) and have a forearm length less than 17.2 mm (0.68 in). While they have a small absolute mass, they are enormous relative to their mothers, weighing up to 30% of her postpartum body weight at birth. Pups' eyes and ears are closed at first, but open within a few hours of birth. They exhibit rapid growth; at around three weeks old, the young start flying, begin the weaning process, and are of a similar size to adults in forearm length but not weight. The young are totally weaned by 26 days old. Females may become sexually mature in the first year of life. Males become sexually mature in their second year.

It is a very long-lived species relative to its body size. In the wild, individuals have been documented living up to 34 years. The average lifespan, however, is around 6.5 years. Males and females have high annual survival rates (probability of surviving another year), though survival rates vary by sex and region. One colony documented in Ontario had a male survival rate of 81.6% and a female survival rate of 70.8%; a colony in southern Indiana had survival rates of 77.1% and 85.7% for males and females, respectively.

=== Social behavior ===
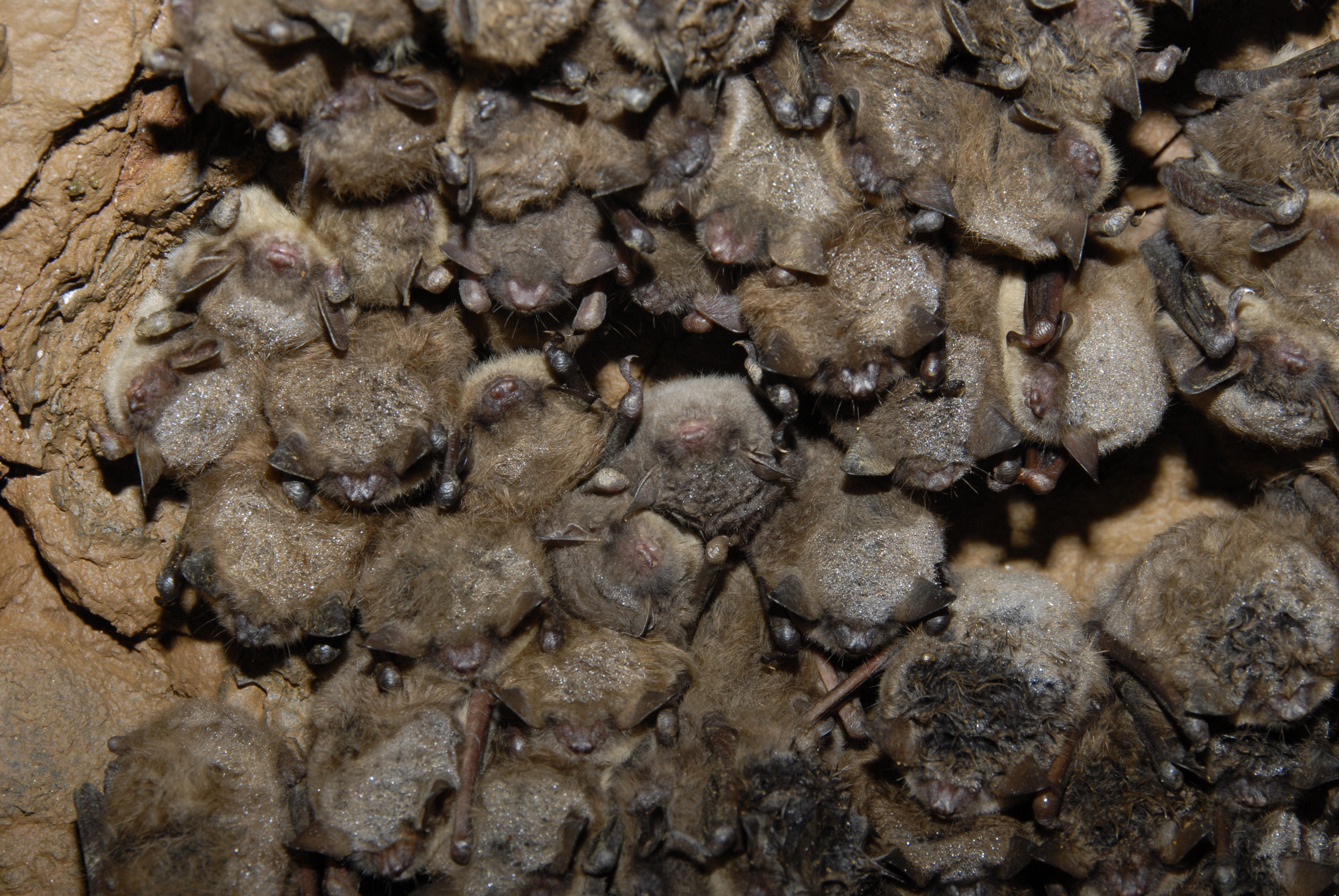
A mixed colony of little brown and Indiana bats in Ohio

The little brown bat is a colonial species, with hibernating colonies consisting of up to 183,500 individuals, though the average colony size is little more than 9,000. Historically, individuals within these colonies were highly aggregated and densely clustered together, though the disease white-nose syndrome is making solitary hibernation more common.

During the spring and summer, maternity colonies of almost all female individuals form. These colonies usually consist of several hundred bats. Outside of these maternity colonies, adult males and non-reproductive females will roost by themselves or in small aggregations. Maternity colonies begin to break apart in late summer.

=== Diet and foraging ===
The little brown bat is nocturnal, resting during the day and foraging at night. Individuals typically emerge from their roosts at dusk, foraging for 1.5–3 hours before stopping to roost. A second foraging bout usually occurs later in the night, ending at dawn.

Little brown bat take off and flight

Based on documenting one individual flying in a wind tunnel, it flies at approximately 5.5 km/h (3.4 mph); this increased to 8.9 km/h (5.5 mph) when flying over the surface of water. Home range size is variable; in one study of 22 females in Canada, pregnant females had an average home range of 30.1 hectares (74 acres) and lactating females had an average of 17.6 hectares (43 acres).

It produces calls that are high intensity frequency modulated (FM) and that last from less than one millisecond (ms) to about 5 ms and have a sweep rate of 80–40 kHz, with most of their energy at 45 kHz. Individuals emit approximately 20 calls per second when in flight.

It consumes a variety of arthropod species, including insects and spiders. Prey species include beetles, flies, mayflies, true bugs, ants, moths, lacewings, stoneflies, and caddisflies. It also consumes mosquitoes, with one study documenting that, across twelve colonies in Wisconsin, 71.9% of all little brown bat guano (feces) samples contained mosquito DNA.

During late pregnancy, when energetic demands are high, females consume around 5.5 g (0.19 oz) of insects nightly, or 1.3 g (0.046 oz) of insects per hour of foraging. With an average body mass of 9.0 g (0.32 oz), that means that pregnant females consume 61% of their body weight nightly. Energetic demands during lactation are even higher, though, with females consuming 6.7 g (0.24 oz) of insects nightly, or 1.7 g (0.060 oz) of insects per hour of foraging. Because lactating females have an average mass of 7.9 g (0.28 oz), this means that they consume nearly 85% of their body weight nightly. As the pup grows, lactation requires more and more energy; at the predicted lactation peak of 18 days old, a female would have to consume 9.9 g (0.35 oz) of insects per night, or 125% of her own weight.

An often-mentioned statement is that "bats can eat 1000 mosquitoes per hour." While the little brown bat does consume mosquitoes and has high energetic needs, the study that is the basis for this claim was an experiment in which individuals were put into rooms full of either mosquitoes or fruit flies. For a duration up to 31 minutes, they captured an average of 1.5–5.7 mosquitoes per minute. The individual most efficient at catching fruit flies caught an average of 14.8 per minute for 15 minutes. Extrapolating these numbers results in conclusions that it can eat approximately 340 mosquitoes per hour, or 890 fruit flies. However, there is no assurance that individuals forage with such high efficiencies for long periods of time, or that prey is dense enough in natural settings to allow capture rates observed in enclosed areas.

=== Predation and disease ===
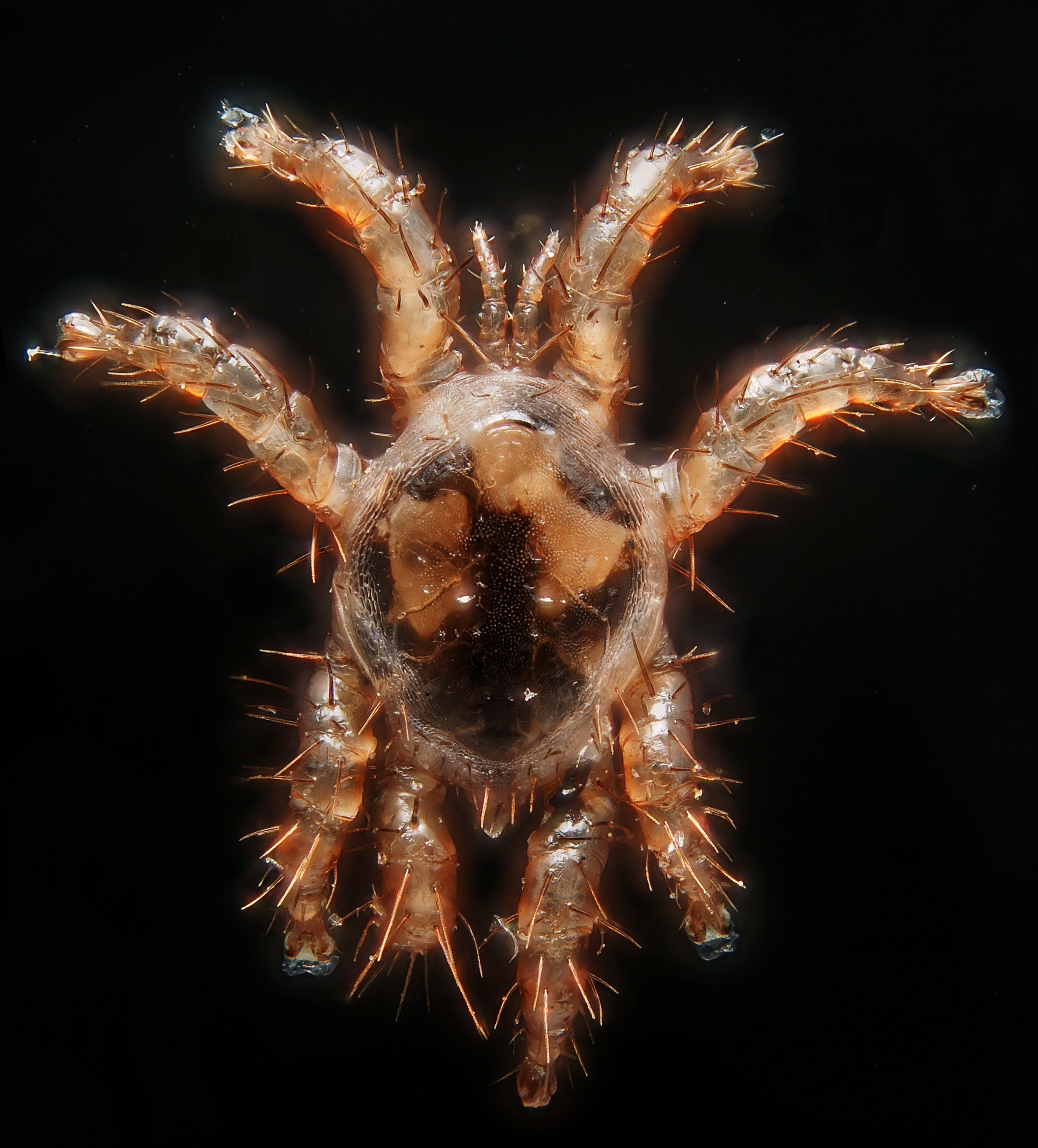
An example of a Spinturnix bat mite, which specialize on bat wings

The little brown bat likely has few predators. Known predators include owls such as the eastern screech owl, northern saw-whet owl, and the great horned owl. Raccoons are also opportunistic predators of the little brown bat, picking individuals off the cave walls of their hibernacula (caves used for hibernation) or eating individuals that have fallen to the cave floor.

The presence of helminth parasites in the gastrointestinal tract of the little brown bat is most common in the spring and fall and least common in the summer. Digenetic trematodes are the most common of these parasites, with the more common of these species including Ototrema schildti and Plagiorchis vespertilionis. The little brown bat is also affected by ectoparasites (external parasites), including bat fleas such as Myodopsylla insignis, chiggers like Leptotrombidium myotis, and the bat mites Spinturnix americanus. When parasitizing a female bat, bat mites synchronize their reproductive cycle with that of their host, with their own reproduction tied to the host's pregnancy hormones. Lactating females have a higher intensity of parasitization by mites, which may promote vertical transmission—the transfer of mites to the bat's offspring.

The little brown bat is affected by the rabies virus—specifically, the strain associated with this species is known as MlV1. However, it is susceptible to other strains of the virus, including those of the big brown bat and the silver-haired bat, which is most lethal to humans. The rabies virus can be present in an individual's saliva, meaning that it can be spread through bites, 12–18 days before the individual begins showing symptoms. Individuals do not always develop rabies after exposure, though. In one study, no little brown bats developed rabies after subcutaneous exposure to the MlV1 strain. Some individuals in the wild have antibodies for the rabies virus.

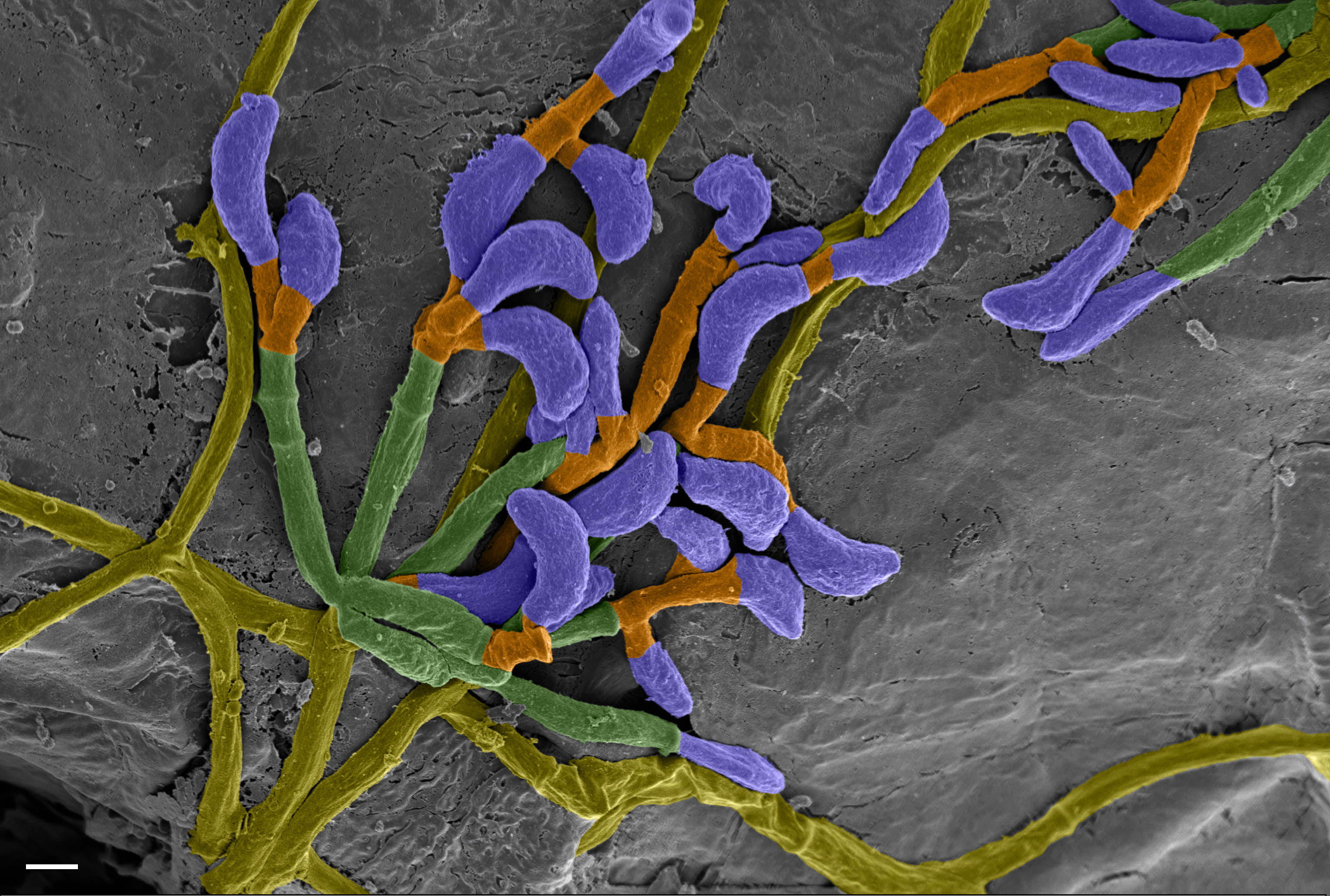
Scanning electron microscope image (false-color) of P. destructans on the muzzle of a little brown bat

The little brown bat is also susceptible to the disease white-nose syndrome, which is caused by the fungus Pseudogymnoascus destructans. The disease affects individuals when they are hibernating, which is when their body temperatures are within the ideal growth range of P. destructans, 1–15 °C (34–59 °F). Pseudogymnoascus destructans is the first known pathogen that kills a mammal host during its torpor. Mortality from white-nose syndrome begins to manifest 120 days after hibernation begins, and mortality peaks 180 days after bats enter hibernacula. The growth of P. destructans on bats erodes the skin of their wing and tail membranes, muzzles, and ears. White-nose syndrome causes affected bats to burn through their energy reserves twice as fast as uninfected individuals. In addition to visible fungus growth on the nose, ears, and wings, white-nose syndrome results in higher carbon dioxide levels in the blood, causing acidosis, and hyperkalemia (elevated blood potassium). Arousal from torpor becomes more frequent, and water loss increases due increased respiration rate in an attempt to remove excess carbon dioxide from the blood. The premature loss of fat reserves during hibernation results in starvation.

Survivors of white-nose syndrome have longer bouts of torpor and lower body temperatures during torpor than individuals that die. Some individuals are more likely to survive based on their genetics, which predisposes them to remain in torpor longer and have larger fat reserves. Little brown bats are most affected by white-nose syndrome when they exhibit social, grouping behavior when hibernating, as P. destructans is transmitted by direct contact. In hibernacula where bats exhibit more solitary behavior, colonies are more prone to avoid infections of white-nose syndrome. In some colonies where grouping behavior was common before exposure to white-nose syndrome, bats now hibernate in a more solitary fashion. Before white-nose syndrome, only 1.16% of little brown bats hibernated singly; after white-nose syndrome, the percentage grew to 44.5%.

== Range and habitat ==
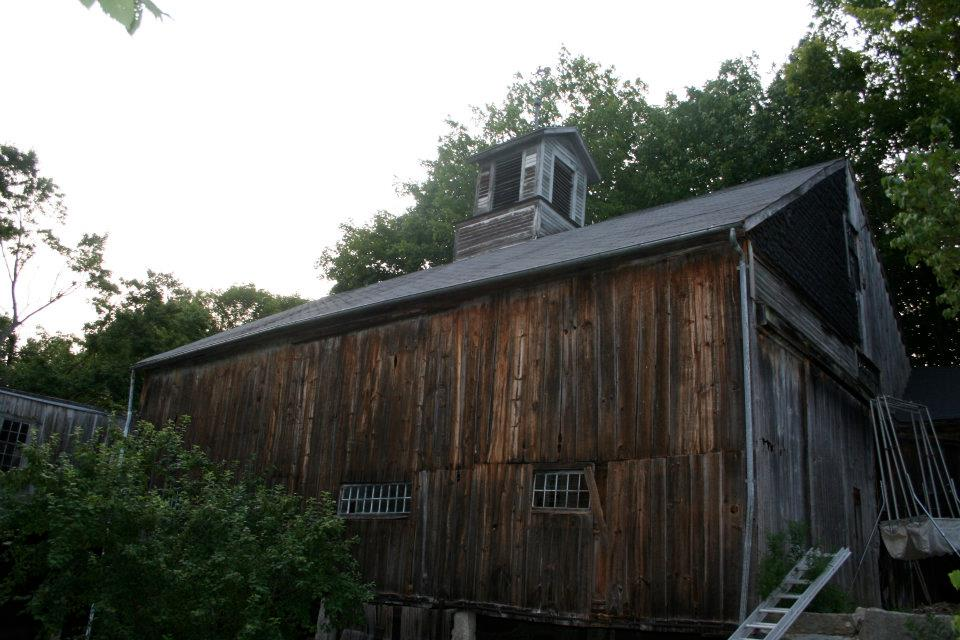
A barn in Massachusetts that is the site of a little brown bat maternity colony

The little brown bat lives throughout much of North America. In the north, its range extends as far west as Alaska and across much of Canada to Labrador. In the south, its range extends to Southern California and across the northern parts of Arizona and New Mexico. Historically, the largest known aggregations of this species occurred in the karstic regions of the Eastern United States.

=== Roosting habitat ===
The little brown bat roosts in sheltered places during the day. These roosts can include human structures or natural structures such as tree hollows, wood piles, rocky outcrops, or, occasionally, caves. Species of trees used for roosting include quaking aspen, balsam poplar, oak, and maple. It prefers roosts that are warm and dark. For maternity colonies, females prefer roosts that are 23.3–34.4 °C (73.9–93.9 °F).

=== Hibernation habitat ===
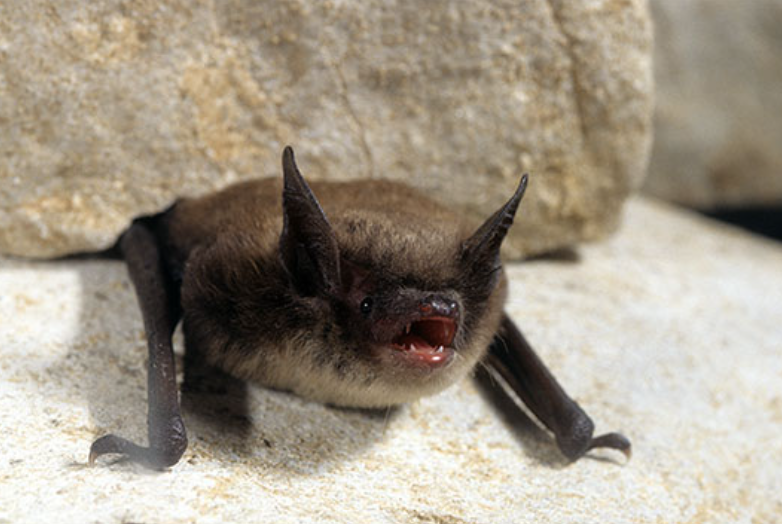
Kenai National Wildlife Refuge, Alaska

The little brown bat hibernates in caves or old mines. Females migrate up to hundreds of kilometers from their summer ranges to reach these hibernacula. It prefers hibernacula in which the relative humidity is greater than 90% and ambient temperatures are above the freezing point. Preferred hibernacula also maintain a constant temperature throughout the winter.

=== Foraging habitat ===
The little brown bat forages along the edges of vegetated habitat. It also forages along the edges of bodies of water or streams. In one study in the Canadian province of Alberta, its foraging activity was significantly higher in old-growth forest than would be expected based on its relative availability.

== Conservation ==
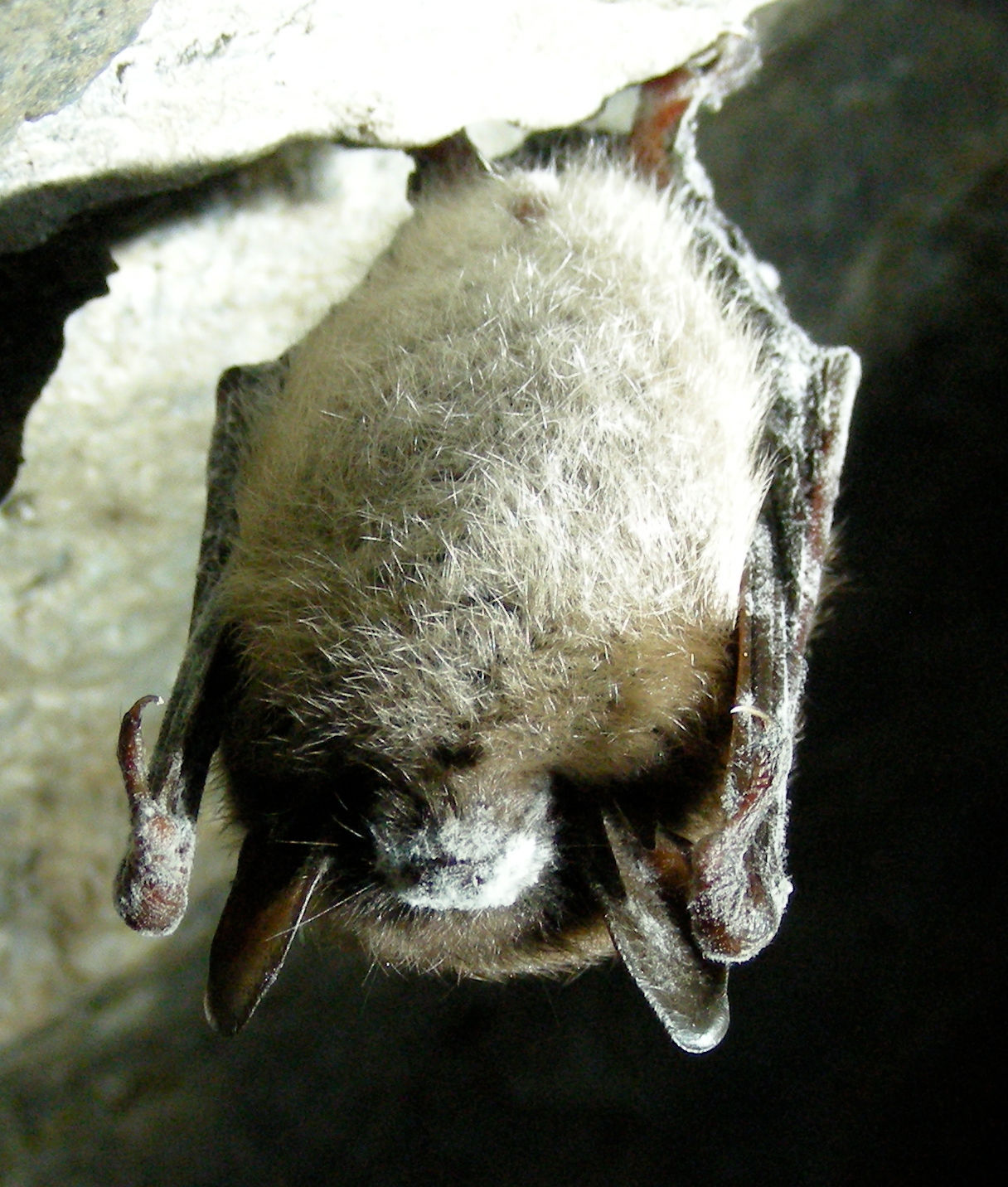
Little brown bat with white-nose syndrome

As of 2021, the little brown bat is evaluated as an endangered species by the IUCN, a dramatic change from 2008 when it was designated as the lowest conservation priority, least concern. Until recently, the species was regarded as one of the most common bats in North America. However, a serious threat to the species has emerged in the form of a fungus-caused disease known as white-nose syndrome. It was one of the first bat species documented with the disease, which now affects at least seven hibernating bat species in the United States and Canada. From 2006 to 2011, over one million little brown bats died from the disease in the Northeastern United States, with winter hibernacula populations declining up to 99%. As of 2017, hibernacula counts for little brown bats in the Northeast had declined by an average of 90%.

White-nose syndrome first appeared in New York in 2006; it has steadily diffused from eastern New York, though, until recently, remaining east of the Rocky Mountains. In March 2016, white-nose syndrome was detected on a little brown bat in King County, Washington, representing a 1,300 mi (2,100 km) jump from the previous westernmost extent of the disease in any bat species.

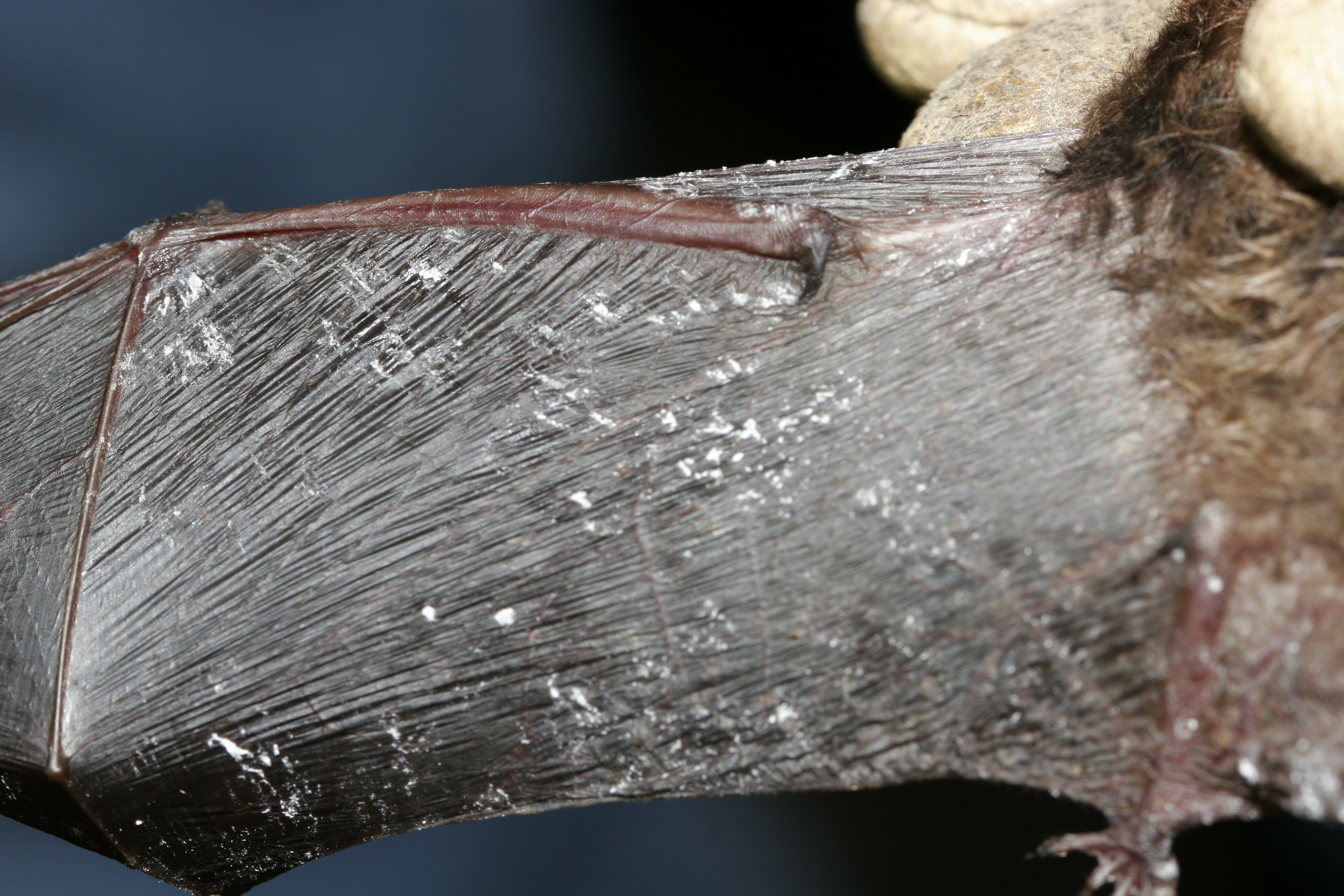
P. destructans growing on the wing of a little brown bat

In 2010, Frick et al. predicted a 99% chance of local extinction of little brown bats by the year 2026. They also predicted that the pre-white-nose syndrome population of 6.5 million individuals could be reduced to as few as 65,000 (1%) via the disease outbreak. Despite heavy declines, the species has avoided extinction in the Northeast through the persistence of small, localized populations. While the mortality rate of the disease is very high, some individuals that are exposed do survive.

In 2010, Kunz and Reichard published a report arguing that the precipitous decline of the little brown bat justified its emergency listing as a federally endangered species under the U.S. Endangered Species Act. However, it is not federally listed as threatened or endangered as of 2025, though several U.S. states list it as endangered (Connecticut, Maine, Massachusetts, New Hampshire, New Jersey, Pennsylvania, Vermont, Virginia), threatened (Tennessee, Wisconsin), or of Special Concern (Michigan, Ohio).

The little brown bat was listed as an endangered species by the Committee on the Status of Endangered Wildlife in Canada in February 2012 after an emergency assessment. The emergency designation as endangered was confirmed in November 2013.

== Relationship to people ==
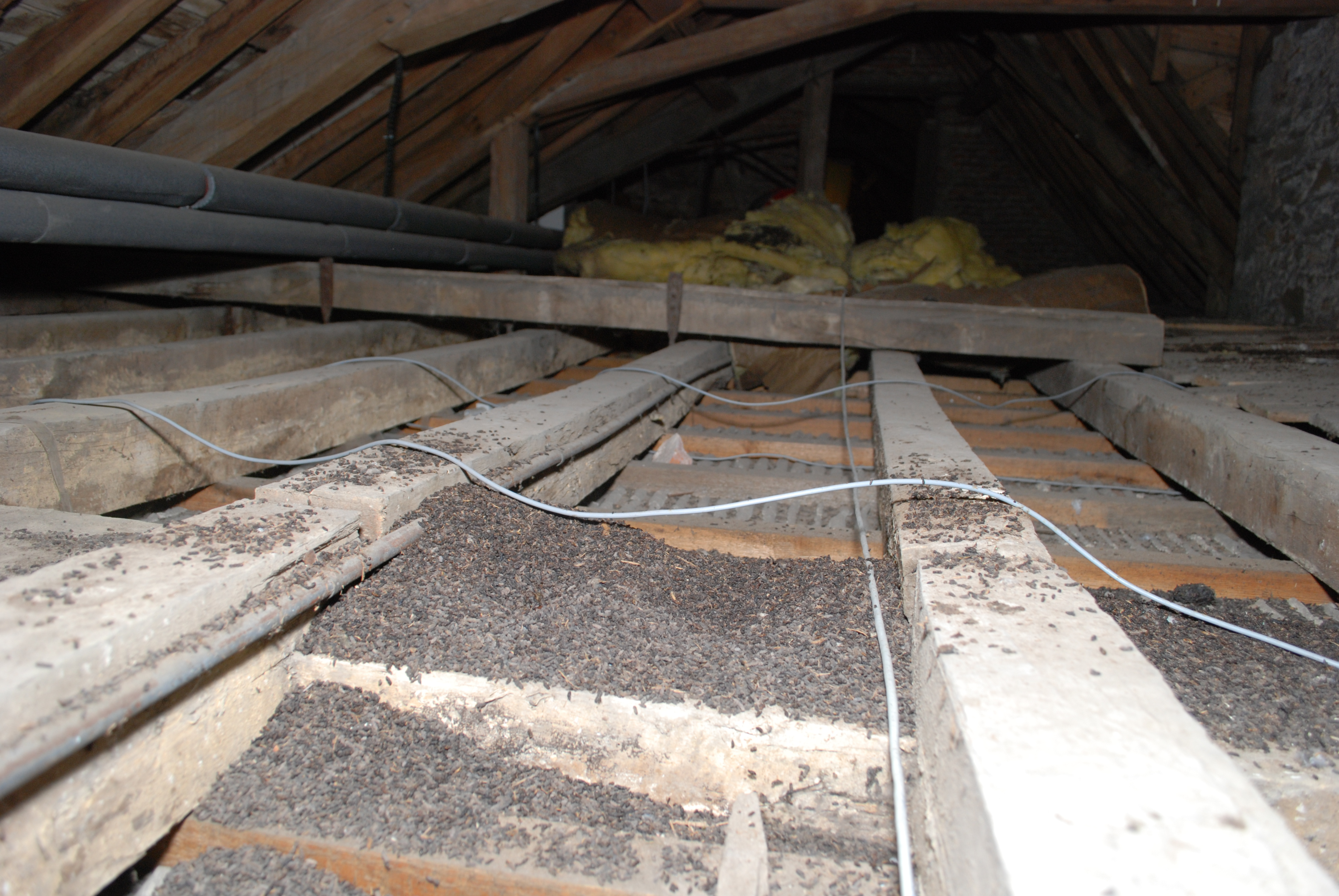
Bat guano in an attic

Little brown bats commonly occupy human structures. Females will situate maternity colonies within buildings. This small body size of this species can make it challenging to prevent individuals from entering a structure, as they can take advantage of gaps or holes as small as 3.8 cm (1.5 in) × 0.64 cm (0.25 in). Once inside a building, a colony of little brown bats can disturb human inhabitants with their vocalizations and production of guano and urine. Large accumulations of guano can provide a growth medium for fungi, including the species that causes histoplasmosis. Concerns about humans becoming affected by bat ectoparasites such as ticks, fleas, or bat bugs are generally unfounded, as parasites that feed on bats are often specific to bats and die without them.

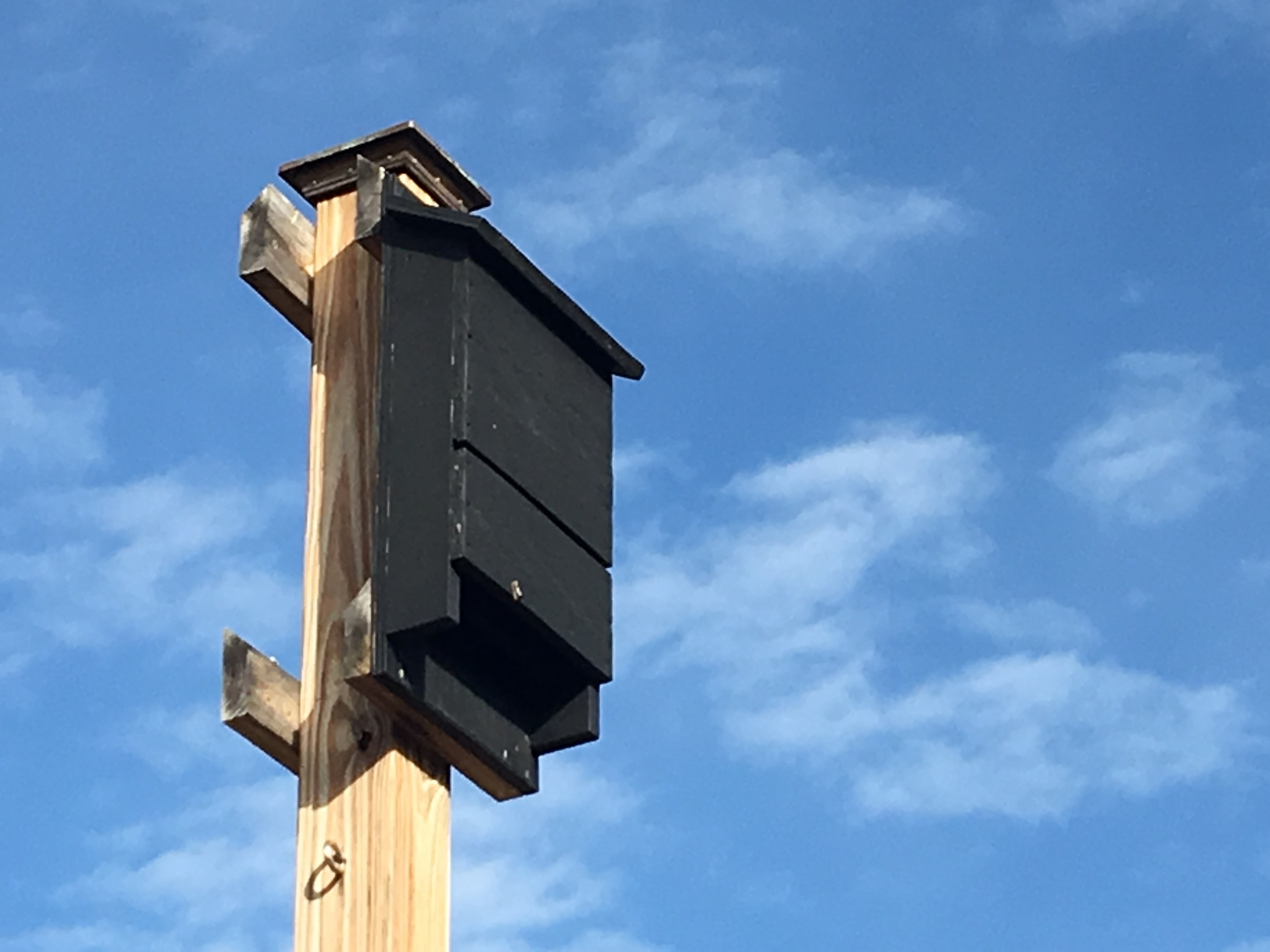
A bat house in New Hampshire

Because they are often found in proximity to humans, the little brown bat and the not-closely related big brown bat are the two bat species most frequently submitted for rabies testing in the United States. Little brown bats infrequently test positive for the rabies virus; of the 586 individuals submitted for testing across the United States in 2015, the most recent data available as of 2018, 16 (2.7%) tested positive for the virus.

Little brown bats are a species that will use bat houses for their roosts. Landowners will purchase or construct bat houses and install them, hoping to attract bats for various reasons. Some install bat houses in an attempt to negate the effects of removing a colony from a human structure ("rehoming" them into a more acceptable space). While this can be effective for other species, there is not evidence to suggest that this is effective for little brown bats, though it has been shown that little brown bats will choose to occupy artificial bat boxes installed at the sites of destroyed buildings that once housed colonies. Others are attempting to help bats out of concern for them due to the effects of white-nose syndrome. Bat houses are also installed in an attempt to control the bats' insect prey such as mosquitoes or taxa that harm crops.

Little brown bats are vulnerable near moving vehicles on roads, either foraging or crossing. Bats can easily be pulled into the slipstreams of faster moving vehicles. When little brown bats cross roads, they approach the road using canopy tree cover and avoid crossing where there is no cover. When the cover is lower, bats cross roads lower.
