= Brown flower bat =

Conservation status
- Least Concern (IUCN 3.1)

Scientific classification
- Kingdom: Animalia
- Phylum: Chordata
- Class: Mammalia
- Order: Chiroptera
- Family: Phyllostomidae
- Genus: Erophylla
- Species: E. bombifrons

Binomial name
- Erophylla bombifrons Miller, 1899

Subspecies
- E.b. bombifrons E.b. santacristobalensis
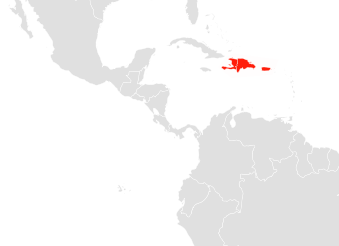
- Range

Species of bat

The brown flower bat (Erophylla bombifrons) is a species of bat from the family Phyllostomidae native to the island of Hispaniola (Haiti and the Dominican Republic) and Puerto Rico.

== Taxonomy ==
In some cases, the brown flower bat is recognized as part of the buffy flower bat, and there are two recognized subspecies: Erophylla bombifrons bombifrons and E. b. santacristobalensis.

== Conservation and habitat ==
Under the IUCN Red List, the brown flower bat is classified as Least Concern because of its population and distribution. Locally common, the brown flower bat can form and roost in colonies of thousands of bats in cooler portions of its habitat. Major threats involve general issues with caves, as it is a hot cave species, hurricanes, and mining in its habitat; it is, however, found in conserved areas.

== Diet and behaviour ==
Compared to other bats, the brown flower bat begins foraging rather late. Its diet consists of some combination of fruit, nectar, and insects; in a more detailed survey of its diet, 75% of specimens had eaten insects, 76% had eaten nectar, and 85% had eaten fruit, and about half had eaten all three during their most recent foraging period. Fecal pellet and fur examinations have determined that this bat often feeds on the fruit of the Jamaican cherry, elderberry, and turkey berry, while visiting the banana flower, guava, and wild tamarind for nectar.

== See also ==
- Buffy flower bat
