= Spinturnix americana =

Scientific classification
- Kingdom: Animalia
- Phylum: Arthropoda
- Subphylum: Chelicerata
- Class: Arachnida
- Order: Mesostigmata
- Family: Spinturnicidae
- Genus: Spinturnix
- Species: S. americana

Binomial name
- Spinturnix americana (Banks, 1902)

Synonyms
- Pteroptus americanus Banks, 1902

Species of mite

Spinturnix americana is a species of mite that parasitizes bat wings. It was described as a new species in 1902 by American entomologist Nathan Banks. Banks initially placed it in the now-defunct genus Pteroptus. The holotype had been collected from a bat in a cave in Indiana. Species that it affects include the little brown bat, northern long-eared bat, and riparian myotis. It has been documented affecting bats in Indiana and Pennsylvania in the United States, Nova Scotia in Canada, and Mato Grosso in Brazil.
