= Tympanospinctus =

Scientific classification
- Kingdom: Animalia
- Phylum: Arthropoda
- Subphylum: Chelicerata
- Class: Arachnida
- Order: Mesostigmata
- Family: Spinturnicidae
- Genus: Tympanospinctus; Berlese, 1918

Genus of mites

Tympanospinctus is a genus of mites in the family Spinturnicidae.
