= Leptotrombidium myotis =

Scientific classification
- Kingdom: Animalia
- Phylum: Arthropoda
- Subphylum: Chelicerata
- Class: Arachnida
- Order: Trombidiformes
- Family: Trombiculidae
- Genus: Leptotrombidium
- Species: L. myotis

Binomial name
- Leptotrombidium myotis (Ewing, 1929)

Synonyms
- Trombicula myotis H.E. Ewing, 1929

Species of mite

Leptotrombidium myotis is a species of mites in the family Trombiculidae that parasitizes bats. Species that it affects include the Arizona myotis, little brown bat, and northern long-eared bat.
