= Periglischrodes =

Scientific classification
- Domain: Eukaryota
- Kingdom: Animalia
- Phylum: Arthropoda
- Subphylum: Chelicerata
- Class: Arachnida
- Order: Mesostigmata
- Family: Spinturnicidae
- Genus: Periglischrodes; Baker & Delfinado, 1964

Genus of mites

Periglischrodes is a genus of mites in the family Spinturnicidae.
