= Ototrema schildti =

Scientific classification
- Kingdom: Animalia
- Phylum: Platyhelminthes
- Class: Trematoda
- Order: Plagiorchiida
- Family: Lecithodendriidae
- Genus: Ototrema
- Species: O. schildti

Binomial name
- Ototrema schildti Font, 1978

Species of fluke

Ototrema schildti is a species of trematode that parasitizes bats. It was described as a new species in 1978. O. schildti was initially discovered in the intestine of a little brown bat in the U.S. state of Wisconsin. Little brown bats have the highest concentration of O. schildti in September and October. It can be a locally common parasite; in one population in Wisconsin, 97% of examined little brown bats were infected by O. schildti, with one bat containing 623 individuals.

== Description ==
Ototrema schildti has an aspinose body measuring 346 to 421 μm long and 181 to 253 μm wide. The oral sucker is 55 to 71 μm long and 61 to 79 μm wide. When the ventrolateral papillae are viewed at an oblique angle they become conspicuous. The trematode lacks a prepharynx and the pharynx is 11 to 20 μm long and 22 to 25 μm wide. The ceca do not extend to the testes. At midlevel the acetabulum measures 55 to 71 μm in diameter. The equatorial and subspherical testes are 44 to 66 μm in diameter.

The curved cirrus sac is 80 to 173 μm long and 33 to 52 μm wide. The sac extends from the dorsal region to reaching or overlapping the acetabulum. It extends anteriorly to the cecal bifurcation, and recurves towards the genital pore in front of the acetabulum. The cirrus is often extended and covered with long and sharp spines. The vasa efferentia unite at the base of the cirrus sac to form an internally winding seminal vesicle.

The ovoid ovary measures 55 to 77 μm long and 40 to 71 μm wide. The ovary has smooth contours and posteriorly tapers towards the oviduct. The seminal recepticale is bipartite and has a long Laurer's canal that rises from the distal ends, extending posteriorly and dorsally. The finely dissected vitellaria are present in lateral fields and do not overlap medially. The vitellaria are in the region between the oral sucker and ceca. The many-coiled uterus fills the posterior section of the body.

The genital pore is median and immediately preacetabular. The oval, operculate eggs measure 18 to 21 μm long and 9 to 11 μm wide. The V-shaped bladder is hidden by the many coils of the uterus, and extends to the testes.
