= Paraperiglischrus =

Scientific classification
- Domain: Eukaryota
- Kingdom: Animalia
- Phylum: Arthropoda
- Subphylum: Chelicerata
- Class: Arachnida
- Order: Mesostigmata
- Family: Spinturnicidae
- Genus: Paraperiglischrus; Rudnick, 1960

Genus of mites

Paraperiglischrus is a genus of mites in the family Spinturnicidae. At least four described species are in Paraperiglischrus, found in Asia, Europe, Africa, Australia, and the Pacific Islands.

The species of Paraperiglischrus, like other members of this family, are parasites of bats. They live primarily on the wing and tail membranes of bats throughout all stages of life.

== Species ==
The genus Paraperiglischrus includes the following four species:

- Paraperiglischrus hipposideros Baker & Delfinado, 1964
- Paraperiglischrus rhinolophinus (C. L. Koch, 1841)
- Paraperiglischrus ruber Estrada-Peña, Ballesta & Ibañez, 1992
- Paraperiglischrus sternalis Petrova & Taskaeva, 1975
