= Cameronieta =

Scientific classification
- Kingdom: Animalia
- Phylum: Arthropoda
- Subphylum: Chelicerata
- Class: Arachnida
- Order: Mesostigmata
- Family: Spinturnicidae
- Genus: Cameronieta; Machado-Allison, 1965

Genus of mites

Cameronieta is a genus of mites in the family Spinturnicidae. There are about seven described species in Cameronieta, found in the Neotropics and Caribbean islands.

The species of Cameronieta, like the other members of this family, are parasites of bats. They live primarily on the wing and tail membranes of bats throughout all stages of life.

== Species ==
These seven species belong to the genus Cameronieta:

- Cameronieta almaensis Almeida, Gettinger & Gardner, 2016
- Cameronieta elongata (Furman, 1966)
- Cameronieta machadoi Dusbábek, 1968
- Cameronieta strandtmanni (Tibbetts, 1957)
- Cameronieta thomasi Machado-Allison, 1965
- Cameronieta tibbettsi Dusbábek, 1968
- Cameronieta torrei Dusbábek, 1968
