= Mesoperiglischrus =

Scientific classification
- Domain: Eukaryota
- Kingdom: Animalia
- Phylum: Arthropoda
- Subphylum: Chelicerata
- Class: Arachnida
- Order: Mesostigmata
- Family: Spinturnicidae
- Genus: Mesoperiglischrus; Dusbábek, 1968

Genus of mites

Mesoperiglischrus is a genus of mites in the family Spinturnicidae. There are at least two described species in Mesoperiglischrus, found in the Neotropics.

The species of Mesoperiglischrus, like the other members of this family, are parasites of bats. They live primarily on the wing and tail membranes of bats throughout all stages of life.

== Species ==
These two species belong to the genus Mesoperiglischrus:

- Mesoperiglischrus natali (Furman, 1966)
- Mesoperiglischrus nyctiellinus Dusbábek, 1968
