= Eyndhovenia =

Scientific classification
- Kingdom: Animalia
- Phylum: Arthropoda
- Subphylum: Chelicerata
- Class: Arachnida
- Order: Mesostigmata
- Family: Spinturnicidae
- Genus: Eyndhovenia; Rudnick, 1960

Genus of mites

Eyndhovenia is a genus of mites in the family Spinturnicidae. There are at least two described species in Eyndhovenia.

The species of Eyndhovenia, like the other members of this family, are parasites of bats. They live primarily on the wing and tail membranes of bats throughout all stages of life.

== Species ==
These two species belong to the genus Eyndhovenia:

- Eyndhovenia brachypus Sun, L.-L. Wang & D.-Q Wang, 1986 - China
- Eyndhovenia euryalis (Canestrini, 1884) - Europe, Asia, Africa, Australia
