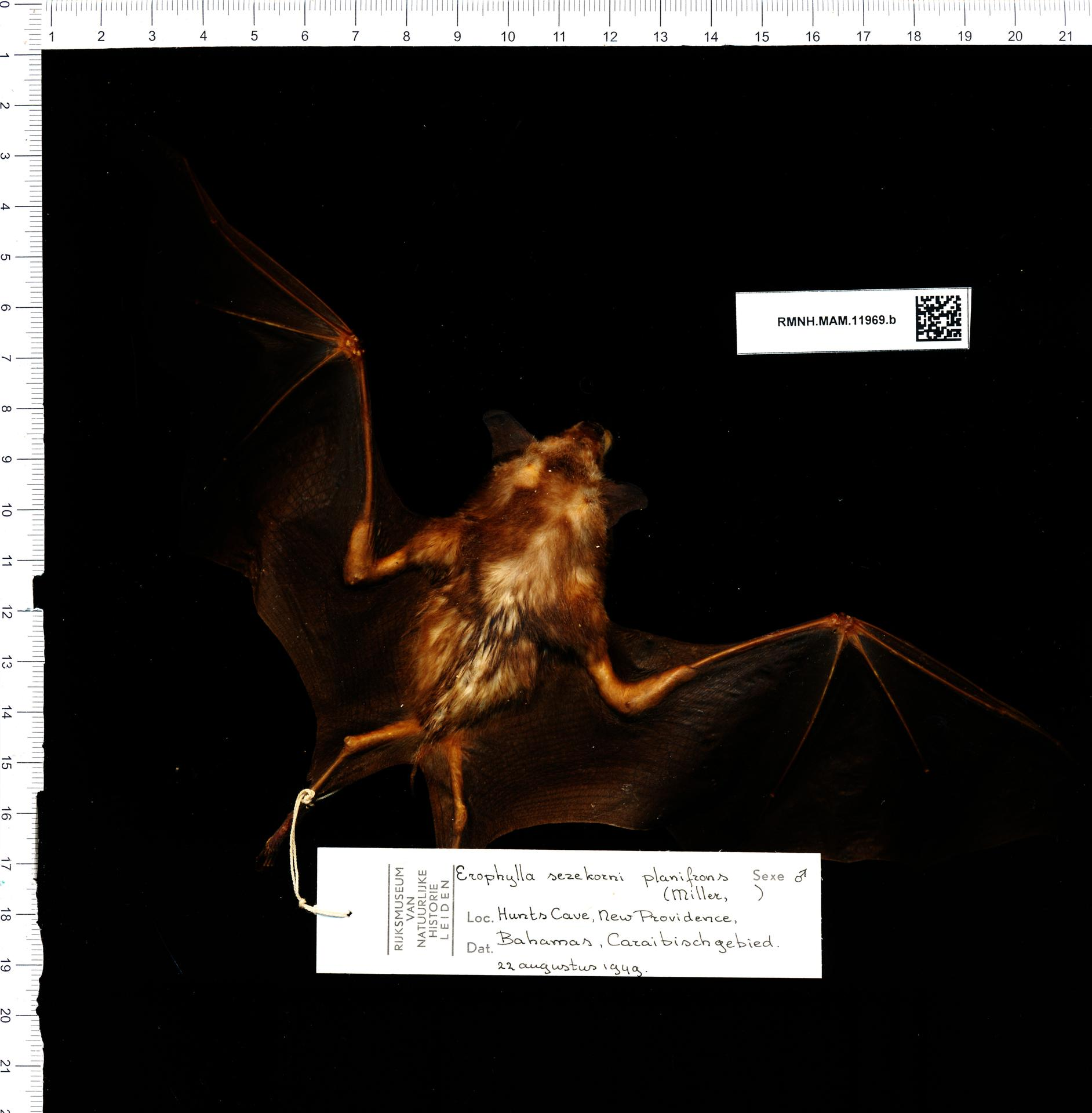

Scientific classification
- Domain: Eukaryota
- Kingdom: Animalia
- Phylum: Chordata
- Class: Mammalia
- Order: Chiroptera
- Family: Phyllostomidae
- Subfamily: Glossophaginae
- Genus: Erophylla; Miller, 1906

Type species
- Phyllonycteris bombifrons Miller, 1899

Species
- Erophylla bombifrons Erophylla sezekorni

= Erophylla =

Genus of bats

Erophylla is a genus of bat in the family Phyllostomidae. It contains the following species:

- Brown flower bat (Erophylla bombifrons)
- Buffy flower bat (Erophylla sezekorni)
