= Myodopsylla insignis =

Scientific classification
- Domain: Eukaryota
- Kingdom: Animalia
- Phylum: Arthropoda
- Class: Insecta
- Order: Siphonaptera
- Family: Ischnopsyllidae
- Genus: Myodopsylla
- Species: M. insignis

Binomial name
- Myodopsylla insignis (Rothschild, 1903)

Synonyms
- Ceratopsylla insignis Rothschild, 1903

Species of flea

Myodopsylla insignis is a species of flea that parasitizes bats. It is found in North America, occurring as far west as Alberta and Iowa and as far east as Pennsylvania and Quebec. It feeds on bats in the genera Eptesicus, Perimyotis, and Myotis. The little brown bat, Myotis lucifugus, is considered its primary host.
