= Oncoscelus =

Scientific classification
- Domain: Eukaryota
- Kingdom: Animalia
- Phylum: Arthropoda
- Subphylum: Chelicerata
- Class: Arachnida
- Order: Mesostigmata
- Family: Spinturnicidae
- Genus: Oncoscelus; Delfinado & Baker, 1963
- Species: O. kanheri

Binomial name
- Oncoscelus kanheri (Hiregaudar & Bal, 1955)

Genus of mites

Oncoscelus is a genus of mites in the family Spinturnicidae. This genus has a single species, Oncoscelus kanheri, found in Indomalaya.

Oncoscelus kanheri, like the other species of this family, are parasites of bats. They live primarily on the wing and tail membranes of bats throughout all stages of life.
