= Emballonuria =

Scientific classification
- Domain: Eukaryota
- Kingdom: Animalia
- Phylum: Arthropoda
- Subphylum: Chelicerata
- Class: Arachnida
- Order: Mesostigmata
- Family: Spinturnicidae
- Genus: Emballonuria; Uchikawa, Zhang, O'Connor & Klompen, 1994
- Species: E. orientalis

Binomial name
- Emballonuria orientalis (Turk, 1950)

Genus of mites

Emballonuria is a genus of mites in the family Spinturnicidae. This genus has a single species, Emballonuria orientalis, found in Sri Lanka.

Emballonuria orientalis, like the other species of this family, are parasites of bats. They live primarily on the wing and tail membranes of bats throughout all stages of life.
