= Ancystropus =

Scientific classification
- Domain: Eukaryota
- Kingdom: Animalia
- Phylum: Arthropoda
- Subphylum: Chelicerata
- Class: Arachnida
- Order: Mesostigmata
- Family: Spinturnicidae
- Genus: Ancystropus; Kolenati, 1856

Genus of mites

Ancystropus is a genus of mites in the family Spinturnicidae. There are about seven described species in Ancystropus, found in Asia, the Middle East, Africa, and South Pacific islands.

The species of Ancystropus, like the other members of this family, are parasites of bats. They live primarily on the wing and tail membranes of bats throughout all stages of life.

== Species ==
These seven species belong to the genus Ancystropus:

- Ancystropus aequatorialis Estrada-Peña, Ballesta & Ibañez, 1992
- Ancystropus aethiopicus Hirst, 1923
- Ancystropus eonycteris Delfinado & Baker, 1963
- Ancystropus leleupi Benoit, 1959
- Ancystropus notopteris Uchikawa, 1990
- Ancystropus taprobanius (Turk, 1950)
- Ancystropus zeleborii Kolenati, 1856
