= Meristaspis =

Scientific classification
- Kingdom: Animalia
- Phylum: Arthropoda
- Subphylum: Chelicerata
- Class: Arachnida
- Order: Mesostigmata
- Family: Spinturnicidae
- Genus: Meristaspis; Kolenati, 1857

Genus of mites

Meristaspis is a genus of mites in the family Spinturnicidae. There are about six described species in Meristaspis, found in Asia, Africa, the Middle East, Australia, and the Pacific islands.

The species of Meristaspis, like the other members of this family, are parasites of bats. They live primarily on the wing and tail membranes of bats throughout all stages of life.

== Species ==
These six species belong to the genus Meristaspis:

- Meristaspis calcarata (Hirst, 1923)
- Meristaspis jordani (Radford, 1947)
- Meristaspis kenyaensis (Radford, 1947)
- Meristaspis lateralis (Kolenati, 1856)
- Meristaspis macroglossi (Hirst, 1923)
- Meristaspis mindanaoensis Delfinado & Baker, 1963
