= Parameristaspis =

Scientific classification
- Domain: Eukaryota
- Kingdom: Animalia
- Phylum: Arthropoda
- Subphylum: Chelicerata
- Class: Arachnida
- Order: Mesostigmata
- Family: Spinturnicidae
- Genus: Parameristaspis; Advani & Vazirani, 1981
- Species: P. delfinadoae

Binomial name
- Parameristaspis delfinadoae Advani & Vazirani, 1981

Genus of mites

Parameristaspis is a genus of mites in the family Spinturnicidae. This genus has a single species, Parameristaspis delfinadoae, found in India.

Parameristaspis delfinadoae, like the other species of this family, are parasites of bats. They live primarily on the wing and tail membranes of bats throughout all stages of life.
