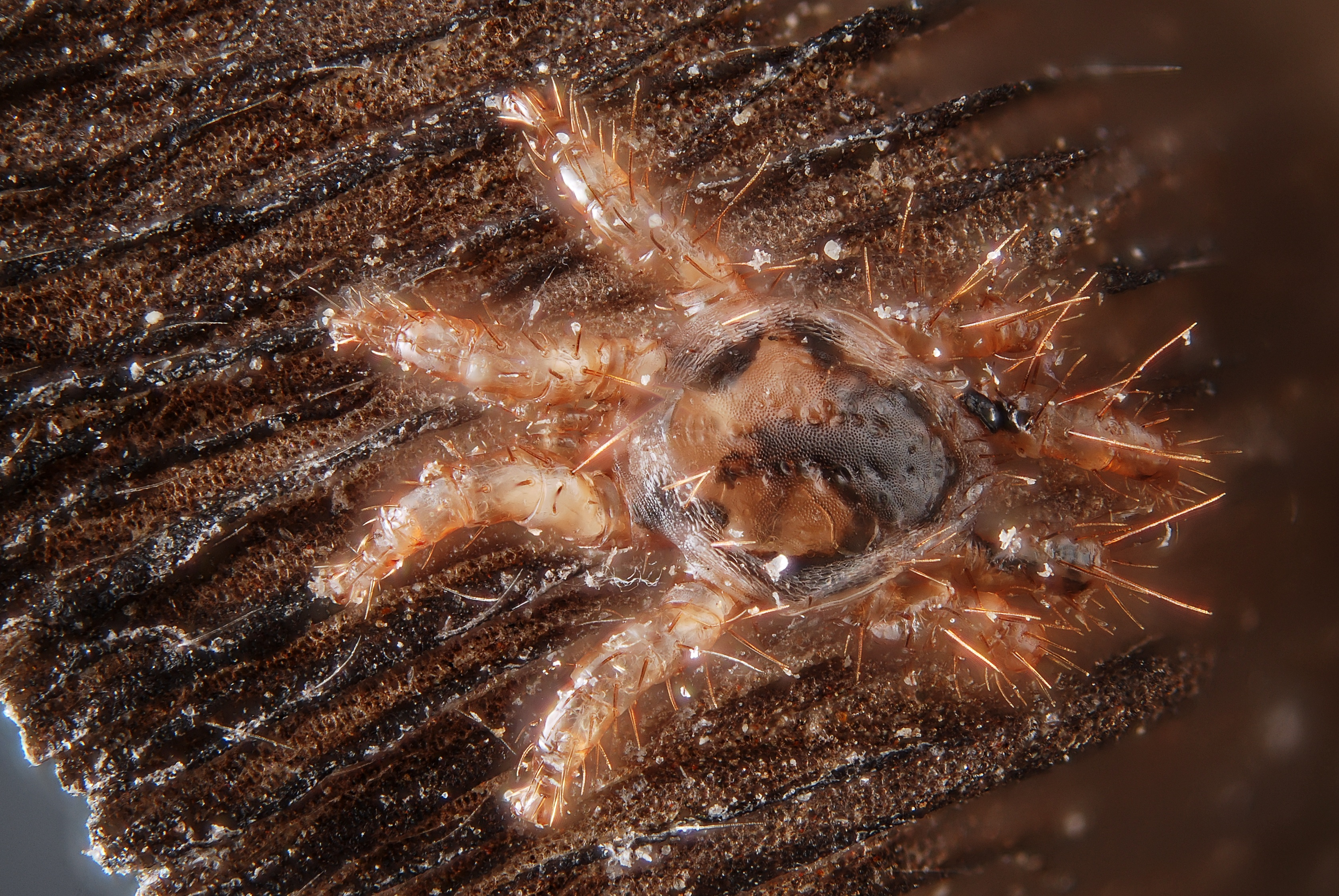

Scientific classification
- Kingdom: Animalia
- Phylum: Arthropoda
- Subphylum: Chelicerata
- Class: Arachnida
- Order: Mesostigmata
- Family: Spinturnicidae
- Genus: Spinturnix von Heyden, 1826

Synonyms
- Paraspinturnix Rudnick, 1960; Pteroptus Dufour, 1832

= Spinturnix =

Genus of mites

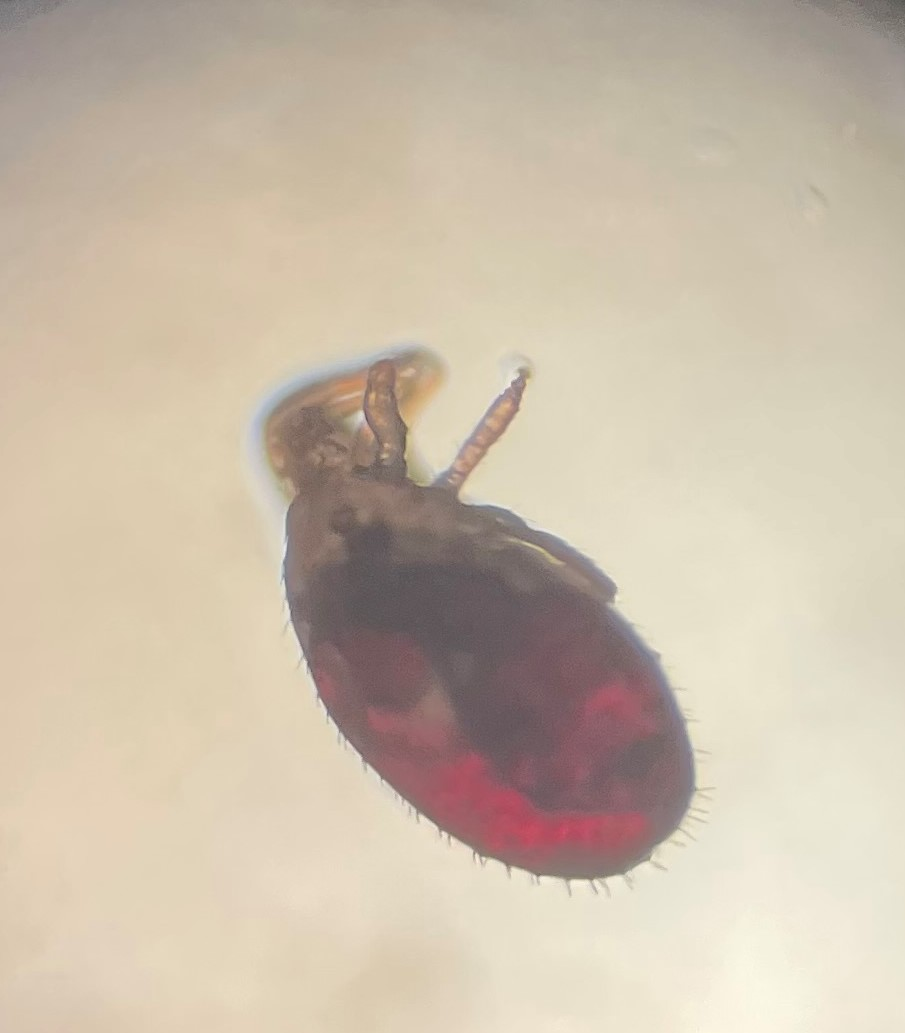
Spinturnix mite pulled from the wing membrane of a Mexican free-tailed bat

Spinturnix is a genus of mites in the family Spinturnicidae. Spinturnix mites are an ectoparasite found on species of bats. They live exclusively on the wing and tail membranes and are large enough to be seen with the naked eye. Spinturnix mites are a host specific species, meaning they have a few major host species that they prefer, as well as a few less frequently used hosts. In short, these mites will not infect arbitrary bat species. Their selection of host tends to align with the host species that lives closest to their local environment. Spinturnix mites are found strictly on Microchiroptera. These mites are hematophagous, meaning they feed on the blood of their host. They cannot survive without a host for more than a few hours. Therefore, transmission of mites to other hosts must occur by close contact, such as a bat in a roost.

Spinturnix mites are crab-like in appearance. Males have a shield-shaped plate on their underside and a pointed abdomen, while females have teardrop shaped shields and a rounded abdomen. The adaptive claws of the mite allows it to grip the wing membrane and efficiently keep hold of their host, even when their host is in flight.

== Life cycle ==
Spinturnix reproduce sexually, but have been shown to align their reproductive cycle on that of its host, specifically by infesting newborns, which are a vulnerable host.

In Spinturnix mites, the egg and larva are embryonated and thus an active protonymph is born. The deuteronymph, which is the second stage of the life cycle, actively parasitizes and is similar to an adult mite in size and appearance. It has been demonstrated that Spinturnix mites end their reproduction and metamorphosis in winter, when their host species go into hibernation cycles. The life cycle of these mites is extremely shortened, which contributes to the instinct to preserve the offspring. Spinturnix mites spend their entire life cycle on the host species.

== Distribution ==
Spinturnix mites can be found globally. They have been seen on bat species from North America to Asia to Europe to Africa.

== Host preference ==
Studies have shown that Spinturnix mites are more prevalent on female hosts than male hosts. There is a higher survival rate for the mites when on a female host. However, Spinturnix mites also show preference towards subadult male hosts. Young host bats that are still dependent on their mother also show a high infestation rate. These preferences demonstrate the Spinturnix mite's ability to detect the host that they find to be the most beneficial to their survival.

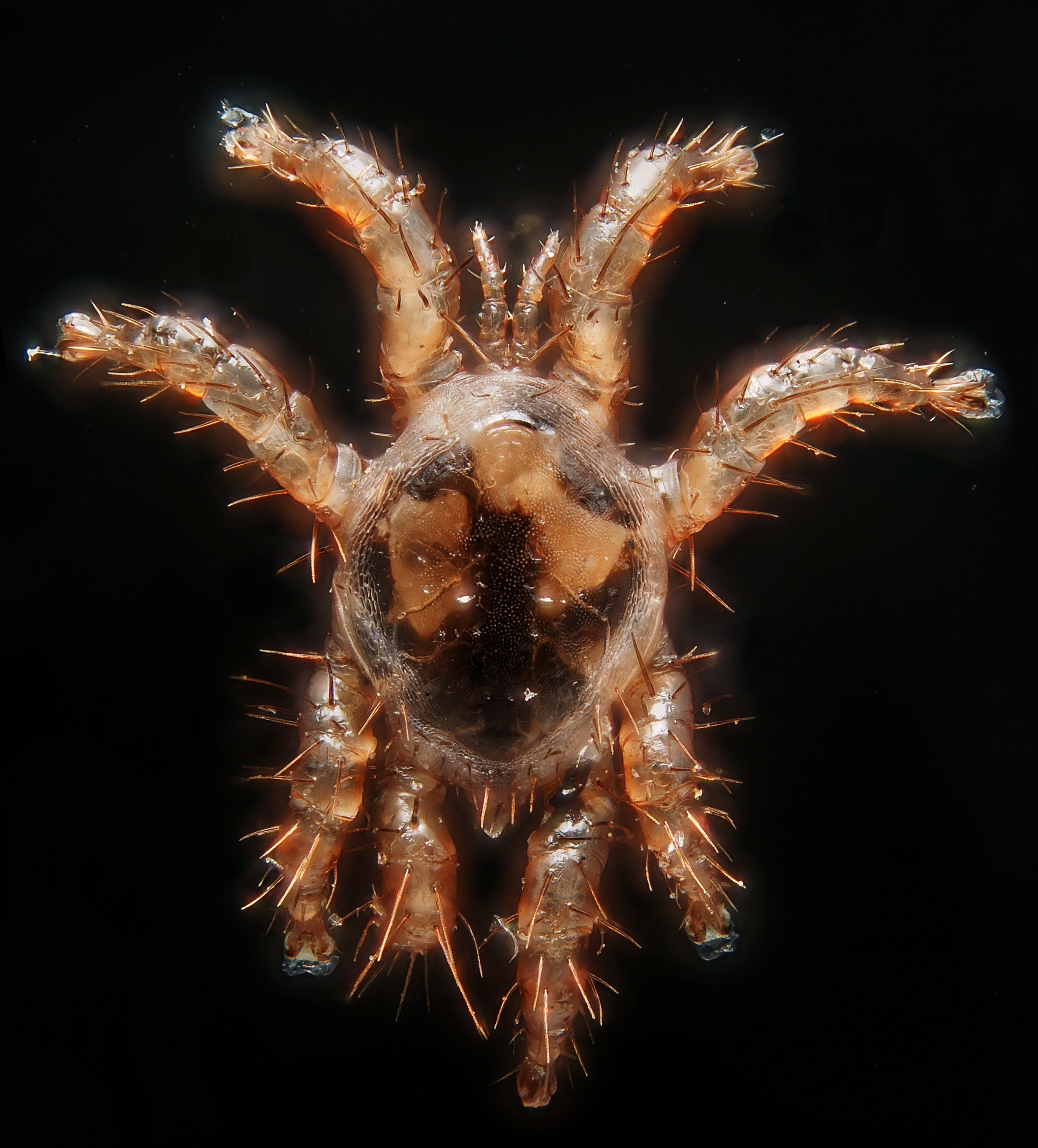
Detailed image of a spinturnix mite.

== Clinical significance ==
Spinturnix mites have a strong influence on the health and fitness of their host species of bats. These mites have the strongest impact during the maternity period of bat species. It has been demonstrated that pregnant or lactating bats have experienced increased oxygen consumption and weight loss due to Spinturnix infestations. Due to their hematophagous nature, these mites can cause anemia, lethargy, and loss of appetite in bats as well.

== Species ==
These 51 species belong to the genus Spinturnix:

- Spinturnix abyssinica Hirst, 1927 - Africa
- Spinturnix acuminata (C. L. Koch, 1836) - Europe, Asia, North Africa
- Spinturnix aelleni Benoit, 1959 - Africa
- Spinturnix americana (Banks, 1902) - North, Central, and South America
- Spinturnix bakeri Rudnick, 1960 - North, Central, and South America
- Spinturnix banksi Rudnick, 1960 - Central United States
- Spinturnix bechsteini Deunff, Walter, Bellido & Volleth, 2004 - Europe, North Africa
- Spinturnix bregetovae Stanyukovich, 1996 - Mongolia, eastern Russian
- Spinturnix brevisetosa Gu & C. S. Wang, 1984 - China
- Spinturnix chiengmai Prasad, 1970 - Thailand
- Spinturnix dasycnemi (Kolenati, 1856) - Europe
- Spinturnix daubentonii (Kolenati, 1857) - Palearctic
- Spinturnix delacruzi Estrada-Peña, Ballesta & Ibañez, 1992 - Equatorial Guinea
- Spinturnix domrowi Deunff & Volleth, 1987 - Malaysia
- Spinturnix emarginata (Kolenati, 1856) - Palearctic
- Spinturnix eptesici Domrow, 1972 - Australia
- Spinturnix faini Benoit, 1959 - DR Congo
- Spinturnix globosa (Rudnick, 1960) - North and Central America
- Spinturnix intecta Dusbábek & Bergmans, 1980 - Nigeria
- Spinturnix kolenatii Oudemans, 1910 - Palearctic
- Spinturnix kolenatoides Ye & Ma, 1996 - China
- Spinturnix lawrencei Zumpt, 1951 - Africa
- Spinturnix loricata Domrow, 1972 - Australia
- Spinturnix maedai Uchikawa & Wada, 1979 - Japan
- Spinturnix mexicana Rudnick, 1960 - Mexico
- Spinturnix multisetosa Rudnick, 1960 - Madagascar
- Spinturnix myoti (Kolenati, 1856) - Europe, Asia, Middle East
- Spinturnix mystacina (Kolenati, 1857) - Palearctic
- Spinturnix nobleti Deunff, Volleth, Keller & Aellen, 1990 - Palearctic
- Spinturnix novaehollandiae Hirst, 1931 - Australia
- Spinturnix nudata Allred, 1969 - Pakistan
- Spinturnix orri Rudnick, 1960 - Mexico, United States
- Spinturnix paracuminata Baker & Delfinado, 1964 - Papua New Guinea
- Spinturnix pindarensis Bhat, 1973 - India
- Spinturnix plecotina (C. L. Koch, 1839) - Europe, Asia, North Africa
- Spinturnix psi (Kolenati, 1856) - Europa, Asia, Africa, Australia, Oceania,
- Spinturnix punctata (Sundevall, 1833) - Palearctic
- Spinturnix rudnicki Advani & Vazirani, 1981 - India
- Spinturnix scotophili Zumpt & Till, 1954 - Africa
- Spinturnix scuticornis Dusbábek, 1970 - Afghanistan, Taiwan
- Spinturnix semilunaris DeMeillon & Lavoipierre, 1944 - Africa, Middle East
- Spinturnix setosus Pan & Teng, 1973 - China
- Spinturnix sinica Gu & C. S. Wang, 1984 - China
- Spinturnix subacuminata Furman, 1966 - Neotropics
- Spinturnix surinamensis Dusbábek & Lukoschus, 1971 - Neotropics
- Spinturnix tibetensis Teng, 1981 - Tibet, Philippines
- Spinturnix traubi Morales-Malacara & López, 1998 - Mexico
- Spinturnix tylonycterisi Deunff & Volleth, 1989 - Malaysia
- Spinturnix uchikawai Orlova, Zhigalin & Zhigalina, 2015 Russia (Kuril Islands)
- Spinturnix walkerae Zumpt & Till, 1954 - Africa
- Spinturnix wilsoni Prasad, 1969 - Papua New Guinea
