= Wild tamarind =

Wild tamarind is a common name for several plants and may refer to:

- Cojoba arborea
- Diploglottis smithii
- Diploglottis diphyllostegia
- Leucaena diversifolia
- Lysiloma latisiliquum
