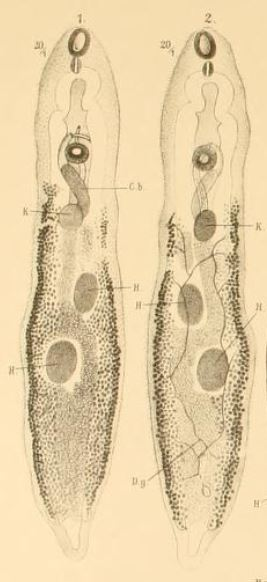

Scientific classification
- Domain: Eukaryota
- Kingdom: Animalia
- Phylum: Platyhelminthes
- Class: Trematoda
- Order: Plagiorchiida
- Family: Plagiorchiidae
- Genus: Plagiorchis
- Species: P. vespertillionis

Binomial name
- Plagiorchis vespertillionis (Müller, 1780)

Synonyms
- Fasciola vespertilionis Müller, 1780

= Plagiorchis vespertillionis =

Species of fluke

Plagiorchis vespertillionis, also sometimes listed as Plagiorchis vespertilionis, is a species of trematode that parasitizes bats. It was described as a new species in 1780 based on specimens collected from a brown long-eared bat in Denmark. In 2007, it was documented within a human host for the first time.
