= Periglischrus =

Scientific classification
- Domain: Eukaryota
- Kingdom: Animalia
- Phylum: Arthropoda
- Subphylum: Chelicerata
- Class: Arachnida
- Order: Mesostigmata
- Family: Spinturnicidae
- Genus: Periglischrus; Kolenati, 1857

Genus of mites

Periglischrus is a genus of mites in the family Spinturnicidae. There are more than 30 described species in Periglischrus, found in South, Central, and North America, and in Africa.

The species of Periglischrus, like the other members of this family, are parasites of bats. They live primarily on the wing and tail membranes of bats throughout all stages of life.

== Species ==
These 31 species belong to the genus Periglischrus:

- Periglischrus acutisternus Machado-Allison, 1964
- Periglischrus caligus Kolenati, 1857
- Periglischrus cubanus Dusbábek, 1968
- Periglischrus delfinadoae Dusbábek, 1967
- Periglischrus dusbabeki Machado-Allison & Antequera, 1971
- Periglischrus empheresotrichus Morales-Malacara, Castaño-Meneses & Klompen in Morales-Malacara et al., 2020
- Periglischrus eurysternus Morales-Malacara, Juan & Juste, 2002
- Periglischrus gameroi Machado-Allison & Antequera, 1971
- Periglischrus grandisoma Herrin & Tipton, 1975
- Periglischrus herrerai Machado-Allison, 1965
- Periglischrus hopkinsi Machado-Allison, 1965
- Periglischrus iheringi Oudemans, 1902
- Periglischrus leptosternus Morales-Malacara & López-Ortega, 2001
- Periglischrus micronycteridis Furman, 1966
- Periglischrus moucheti Till, 1958
- Periglischrus nycteris Till, 1958
- Periglischrus ojastii Machado-Allison, 1964
- Periglischrus paracaligus Herrin & Tipton, 1975
- Periglischrus paracutisternus Machado-Allison & Antequera, 1971
- Periglischrus paratorrealbai Herrin & Tipton, 1975
- Periglischrus paravargasi Herrin & Tipton, 1975
- Periglischrus parvus Machado-Allison, 1964
- Periglischrus ramirezi Machado-Allison & Antequera, 1971
- Periglischrus setosus Machado-Allison, 1964
- Periglischrus squamosus Machado-Allison, 1965
- Periglischrus steresotrichus Morales-Malacara & Juste, 2002
- Periglischrus tonatii Herrin & Tipton, 1975
- Periglischrus torrealbai Machado-Allison, 1965
- Periglischrus triaenopsis Benoit, 1961
- Periglischrus vargasi Hoffmann, 1944
- Periglischrus zuluensis Till, 1958
