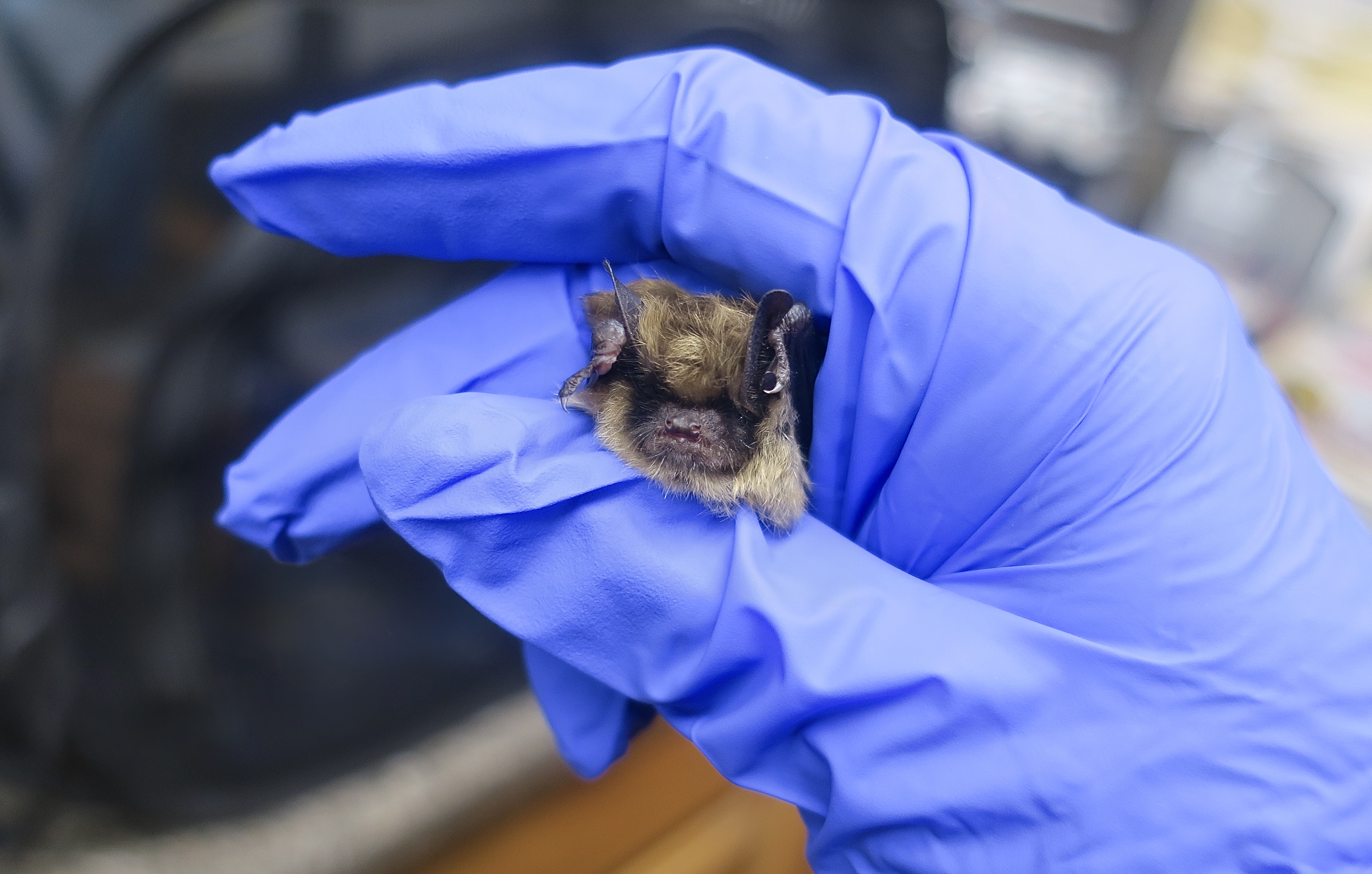
- An Arizona myotis in human care by licensed rehabilitators at Grand Canyon Deer Farm.

Conservation status
- Least Concern (IUCN 3.1)

Scientific classification
- Kingdom: Animalia
- Phylum: Chordata
- Class: Mammalia
- Order: Chiroptera
- Family: Vespertilionidae
- Genus: Myotis
- Species: M. occultus

Binomial name
- Myotis occultus Hollister, 1909
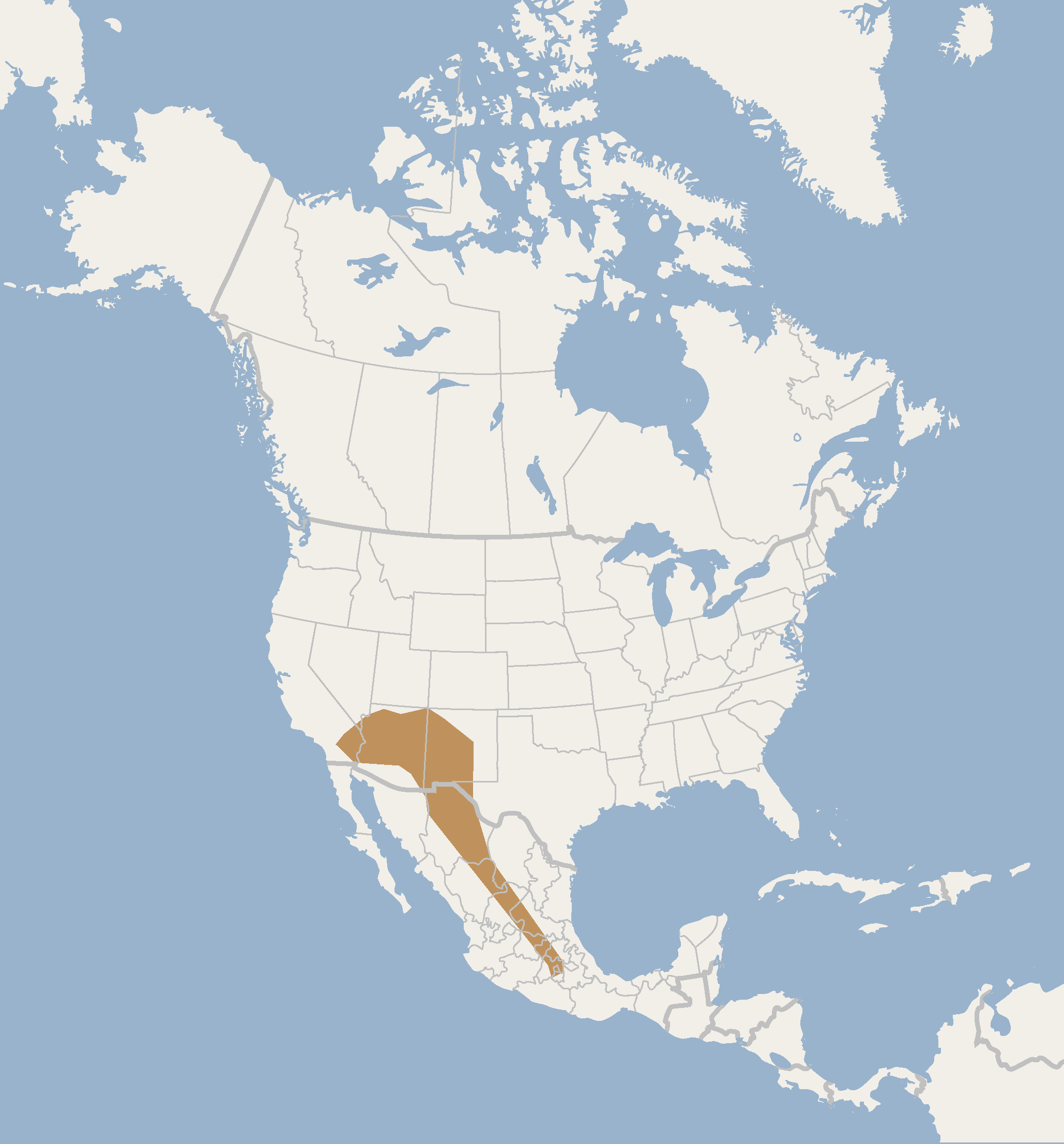

= Arizona myotis =

Species of bat

The Arizona myotis (Myotis occultus) or southwestern little brown myotis is a vesper bat species inhabiting much of the southwestern United States and central Mexico as far south as the Distrito Federal.

== Taxonomy and etymology ==
It was described as a new species in 1909 by American zoologist Ned Hollister. The holotype was collected near Needles, California, in 1905. Its specific name "occultus" is Latin for "hidden or concealed".

== Description ==
It is a small species with a total length of 96 mm (3.8 in)— of the total length, 40 mm (1.6 in) consists of its tail. Its fur is glossy brown with a cinnamon tint. The ventral fur and its face are paler brown.

== Range and habitat ==
Its range includes parts of the Southwestern United States and the Mexican state of Chihuahua. It is found in a range of elevations from near sea level to 2,806 m (9,206 ft) above sea level.

== Conservation ==
As of 2018, it is evaluated as a least-concern species by the IUCN. It meets the criteria for this classification because it has a wide geographic range, its range includes protected areas, and it is not likely experiencing rapid population decline.
