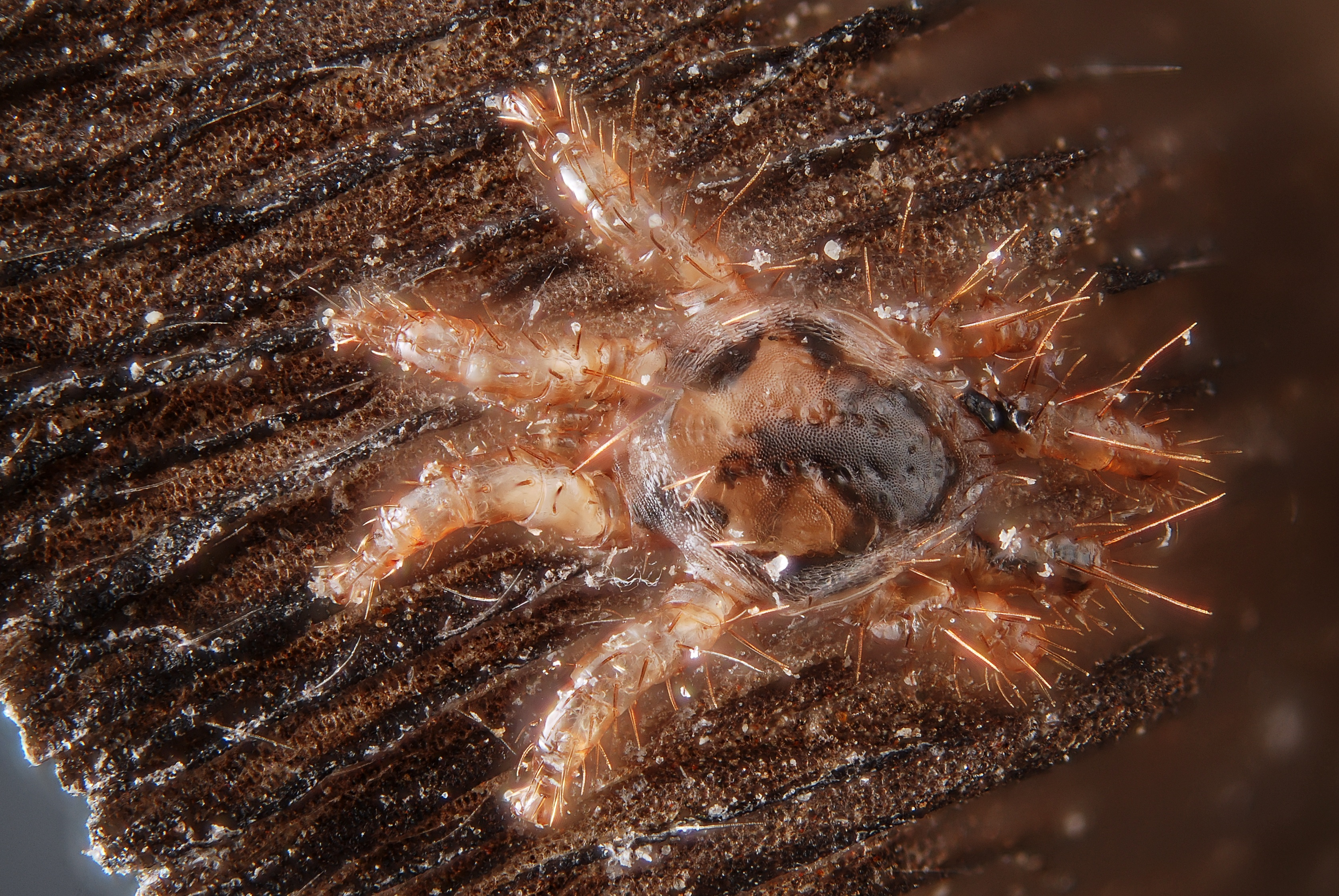

Scientific classification
- Kingdom: Animalia
- Phylum: Arthropoda
- Subphylum: Chelicerata
- Class: Arachnida
- Order: Mesostigmata
- Superfamily: Dermanyssoidea
- Family: Spinturnicidae; Oudemans, 1902

= Spinturnicidae =

Family of mites

Spinturnicidae is a family of mites in the order Mesostigmata. The mites are highly specialized parasites of wing or tail membrane of bats. Some species infest eyelids and eye canthi. The species of Spinturnicidae are found in bat habitats throughout the world, living all stages of life on bats.

== Genera ==
These 11 genera belong to the family Spinturnicidae:

- Ancystropus Kolenati, 1856
- Cameronieta Machado-Allison, 1965
- Emballonuria Uchikawa, Zhang, O'Connor & Klompen, 1994
- Eyndhovenia Rudnick, 1960
- Meristaspis Kolenati, 1857
- Mesoperiglischrus Dusbábek, 1968
- Oncoscelus Delfinado & Baker, 1963
- Parameristaspis Advani & Vazirani, 1981
- Paraperiglischrus Rudnick, 1960
- Periglischrus Kolenati, 1857
- Spinturnix von Heyden, 1826
