= List of mammals of New Jersey =

This is a list of wild mammal species that live in the state of New Jersey. New Jersey Fish and Wildlife recognizes 89 species of mammals that live wild in the state, including native species and introduced species. This page includes all animals known to NJF&W as well as some additional species which were not listed by them.

== Artiodactyla (even-toed ungulates) ==
Artiodactyla (even-toed ungulates)
Common name	Scientific name	Status in New Jersey	Notes
White-tailed deer	Odocoileus virginianus	Decreasing, Secure	White-tailed deer were nearly extirpated from New Jersey in the early 20th Century due to unregulated overhunting and habitat loss. The population recovered throughout the 20th Century as a result of protection, habitat restoration, and the elimination of their natural predators. By the 1980s, the statewide population was over 200,000. The population is now managed through recreational hunting, and numbered roughly 110,000 statewide in 2022. New Jersey Fish and Wildlife considers white-tailed deer to be overpopulated, creating hazards such as vehicle collisions, crop damage, and the spread of diseases such as Lyme disease.

== Carnivora (carnivorans) ==
Carnivora (carnivorans)
Common name	Scientific name	Status in New Jersey	Notes
Eastern coyote	Canis latrans	Increasing	Native to western North America, coyotes were first detected in New Jersey in 1939 as they expanded their range eastward. They have continued to increase their distribution across the state, becoming common statewide today. They are hunted and trapped recreationally.
Hooded seal	Cystophora cristata	Peripheral	Periodically seen along the New Jersey Shore.
Gray seal	Halichoerusgrypus	Peripheral	Commonly seen along the New Jersey shore.
North American river otter	Lontra canadensis	Stable	Common statewide, especially in wetland habitats. They are trapped recreationally.
Bobcat	Lynx rufus	Threatened	Bobcats were nearly extirpated from the state by the early 20th Century due to overhunting and deforestation. Reintroduction began in the late 1970s and early 1980s, and the bobcat was protected as a state Endangered species in 1991. Bobcats have since expanded their range across New Jersey, with concentrations in the forests of northern New Jersey and the Pine Barrens of southern New Jersey.
Striped skunk	Mephitis mephitis	Stable	Common across New Jersey.
Short-tailed weasel	Mustela erminea	Undetermined	Sparsely recorded in New Jersey.
Long-tailed weasel	Mustela frenata	Stable	Present across New Jersey, with more sightings in the north.
American mink	Neogale vison	Stable	Common across New Jersey, especially in wetland habitats. They are trapped recreationally.
Harp seal	Pagophilus groenlandicus	Peripheral	Occasionally seen on the New Jersey shore, especially in early spring.
Fisher	Pekania pennanti	Increasing	Fishers were extirpated from New Jersey by the late 1800s due to fur trapping and habitat loss. They began returning to the state in the 2000s, expanding their range following reintroductions in neighboring Pennsylvania and New York. They are becoming increasingly common in northwestern New Jersey.
Harbor seal	Phoca vitulina	Stable	Common along the New Jersey shore in winter.
Raccoon	Procyon lotor	Stable	Raccoons are common statewide and trapped recreationally.
Ringed seal	Pusa hispida	Vagrant	Occasionally spotted on the New Jersey shore.
Gray fox	Urocyon cinereoargenteus	Stable	Gray foxes are common statewide, especially in forested areas.They are trapped recreationally.
American black bear	Ursus americanus	Increasing	In the early 20th Century, black bears were nearly extirpated from New Jersey due to habitat loss and unregulated overhunting. They began to return in small numbers during the mid 20th Century as habitat recovered, with approximately 100 bears in the state by 1970. Following their protection and management in the 1970s, the population began to increase dramatically. Currently there are approximately 3,000 to 4,000 black bears across New Jersey. They are most common in the forested habitats of northern New Jersey but have continued to expand their range, with presence in nearly every county.
Red fox	Vulpes vulpes	Stable	Red foxes in New Jersey are primarily descended from small populations of native North American red foxes that expanded their range, rather than introduced Eurasian red foxes as was long believed. Rare in New Jersey in colonial times, red foxes have become common statewide. They are trapped recreationally and sometimes managed as nuisance animals.

== Cetacea (whales, dolphins, and porpoises) ==
Cetacea (whales, dolphins, and porpoises)
Common name	Scientific name	Status in New Jersey	Notes
Minke whale	Balaenoptera acutorostrata	Undetermined	Periodically observed on the coast, especially near Cape May and Sandy Hook.
Sei whale	Balaenoptera borealis	Endangered	Frequently detected in the New York Bight in early spring.
Blue whale	Balaenoptera musculus	Endangered	Rarely spotted off the coast.
Fin whale	Balaenoptera physalus	Endangered	Frequently encountered near the coast and in Delaware Bay.
Beluga whale	Delphinapterus leucas	Peripheral	Occasionally observed near the coast.
Common dolphin	Delphinus delphis	Undetermined	Periodically recorded offshore in groups.
North Atlantic right whale	Eubalaena glacialis	Endangered	Present off the coast, especially during fall and spring migration.
Short-finned pilot whale	Globicephala macrorhynchus	Undetermined	Detected in high numbers off the coast.
Long-finned pilot whale	Globicephala melaena	Undetermined	Detected in high numbers off the coast.
Risso's dolphin	Grampus griseus	Undetermined	Recorded offshore.
Pygmy sperm whale	Kogia breviceps	Undetermined	Occasionally recorded off the coast, sometimes becoming stranded onshore.
Dwarf sperm whale	Kogia sima	Undetermined	Recorded off the coast, sometimes becoming stranded onshore.
Humpback whale	Megaptera novaeangliae	Endangered	Common along the shore. Juveniles are often seen in spring, summer, and fall.
Blainville's beaked whale	Mesoplodon densirostris	Undetermined	Rarely seen in on the coast.
Gervais's beaked whale	Mesoplodon europaeus	Undetermined	Observed along the coast in summer.
True's beaked whale	Mesoplodon mirus	Undetermined	Recorded off the coast in summer.
Orca	Orcinus orca	Undetermined	Occasionally observed off the coast in historical records.
Harbour porpoise	Phocoena phocoena	Special concern	Present near the coast and in bays, harbors, and estuaries, mostly in winter.
Sperm whale	Physeter macrocephalus	Endangered	Occasionally recorded off the coast.
Clymene dolphin	Stenella clymene	N/A	The waters off the coast of New Jersey represent the northern limit of the Clymene dolphin's range.
Striped dolphin	Stenella coeruleoalba	Undetermined	Periodically seen offshore in large groups.
Atlantic spotted dolphin	Stenella frontalis	Undetermined	Occasionally recorded off the coast.
Common bottlenose dolphin	Tursiops truncatus	Stable	Frequently observed near the shore, especially near Cape May.
Cuvier's beaked whale	Ziphius cavirostris	Undetermined	Occasionally seen on the coast.

== Chiroptera (bats) ==
New Jersey is a year-round home to 6 species of bats, and a temporary residence for 4 more. Their populations are monitored with acoustic surveys in collaboration with the of the North American Bat Monitoring Program.

Chiroptera (bats)
Common name	Scientific name	Status in New Jersey	Notes
Silver-haired bat	Lasionycteris noctivagans	Undetermined	Migratory species and partial resident in New Jersey.
Big brown bat	Eptesicus fuscus	Stable	Permanent breeding resident in New Jersey.
Eastern red bat	Lasiurus borealis	Stable	Migratory species and partial resident in New Jersey.
Northern yellow bat	Lasiurus intermedius	Peripheral	Northern yellow bats are extremely uncommon in New Jersey, with only a few records of their presence.
Hoary bat	Lasiurus cinereus	Undetermined	Migratory species and partial resident in New Jersey.
Eastern small-footed myotis	Myotis leibii	Undetermined	Permanent breeding resident in New Jersey.
Little brown bat	Myotis lucifugus	Declining	Permanent breeding resident in New Jersey. Little brown bats are declining due to white-nose syndrome.
Northern long-eared bat	Myotis septentrionalis	Undetermined	Permanent breeding resident in New Jersey.
Indiana bat	Myotis sodalis	Endangered	Permanent breeding resident in New Jersey. Indiana bats are federally endangered.
Tricolored bat	Perimyotis subflavus	Undetermined	Permanent breeding resident in New Jersey.

== Didelphidae (opossums) ==
Didelphidae (opossums)
Common name	Scientific name	Status in New Jersey	Notes
Virginia opossum	Didelphis virginiana	Stable	Common statewide.

== Eulipotyphla (shrews and moles) ==
Eulipotyphla (shrews and moles)
Common name	Scientific name	Status in New Jersey	Notes
Northern short-tailed shrew	Blarina brevicauda	Stable	Found throughout New Jersey.
Star-nosed mole	Condylura cristata	Undetermined	Occasionally seen in New Jersey.
North American least shrew	Cryptotis parva	Undetermined	Occasionally detected in New Jersey.
Hairy-tailed mole	Parascalops breweri	Undetermined	Found in northern New Jersey.
Eastern mole	Scalopus aquaticus	Stable	Common across New Jersey.
Masked shrew	Sorex cinereus	Stable	Found across New Jersey, especially in spring.
Tuckahoe masked shrew	Sorex cinereus nigriculus	Undetermined	Present in northern New Jersey.
Long-tailed shrew	Sorex dispar	Undetermined	First detected in New Jersey in 1956.
Smoky shrew	Sorex fumeus	Stable	Occasionally seen in New Jersey.
American pygmy shrew	Sorex hoyi	Stable	Occasionally seen in New Jersey.
American water shrew	Sorex palustris	Undetermined	Occasionally seen in New Jersey.

== Lagomorpha (rabbits and hares) ==
Lagomorpha (rabbits and hares)
Common name	Scientific name	Status in New Jersey	Notes
Black-tailed jackrabbit	Lepus californicus	Introduced	Black-tailed jackrabbits are legally hunted in New Jersey.
European hare	Lepus europaeus	Introduced	European hares are legally hunted in New Jersey.
White-tailed jackrabbit	Lepus townsendii	Introduced	White-tailed jackrabbits are legally hunted in New Jersey.
European rabbit	Oryctolagus cuniculus	Introduced	Occasionally recorded in New Jersey.
Eastern cottontail	Sylvilagus floridanus	Stable	New Jersey's only common native lagomorph.
New England cottontail	Sylvilagus transitionalis	Undetermined	New Jersey Division of Fish and Wildlife reports the New England cottontail's undetermined presence.

== Rodentia (rodents) ==
Rodentia (rodents)
Common name	Scientific name	Status in New Jersey	Notes
North American beaver	Castor canadensis	Increasing	Common across New Jersey, especially in wetland habitat. Beavers were historically trapped to the point of near extirpation in the state by 1900. They were legally protected beginning in 1903, with reintroductions from other states augmenting the population throughout the early 20th Century. Limited trapping seasons began in the mid 20th Century, with annual trapping seasons beginning in 1970 and continuing to the present. In 2015 there were estimated to be at least 10 to 15 million beavers in New Jersey.
Southern red-backed vole	Clethrionomys gapperi	Stable	Southern red-backed voles are mostly known from historic specimens collected around the state, mostly from southern New Jersey.
North American porcupine	Erethizon dorsatum	Increasing	Common in forested habitat of northwestern New Jersey.
Northern flying squirrel	Glaucomys sabrinus	Undetermined	This species is known in New Jersey from rare sightings only.
Southern flying squirrel	Glaucomys volans	Common	Most prevalent in forested areas, especially the New Jersey Pine Barrens.
Groundhog	Marmota monax	Stable	Common statewide. They are legally hunted and trapped for recreation and nuisance control.
Eastern meadow vole	Microtus pennsylvanicus	Stable	Common across New Jersey, especially in agricultural habitat and fields.
Woodland vole	Microtus pinetorum	Stable	Present in southern New Jersey.
House mouse	Mus musculus	Introduced	Common in urbanized areas statewide and often treated as a pest.
Nutria	Myocastor coypus	Introduced	Native to South America, nutria was first detected in New Jersey in 2007.
Woodland jumping mouse	Napaeozapus insignis	Undetermined	
Eastern woodrat	Neotoma floridana	Endangered	Once distributed across northern New Jersey, the eastern woodrat had declined to a single known population in the Palisades by 1999.
Allegheny woodrat	Neotoma magister	Endangered	This species is known from a small population in northeastern New Jersey. Their range farther north has declined in recent decades.
Muskrat	Ondatra zibethicus	Stable	Common statewide, especially in wetland habitat.
Marsh rice rat	Oryzomys palustris	Stable	Documented infrequently in southern New Jersey.
White-footed mouse	Peromyscus leucopus	Stable	Common statewide.
Eastern deer mouse	Peromyscus maniculatus	Unranked	Occasionally reported in New Jersey.
Brown rat	Rattus norvegicus	Introduced	Common across New Jersey, especially in urbanized areas.
Black rat	Rattus rattus	Introduced	Common statewide and treated as a pest.
Eastern gray squirrel	Sciurus carolinensis	Stable	Common statewide, especially in habitat with oak and hickory.
Southern bog lemming	Synaptomys cooperi	Undetermined	Southern bog lemmings are only known in New Jersey from older specimens collected on the southern coastal plain.
Eastern chipmunk	Tamias striatus	Stable	Common statewide.
American red squirrel	Tamiasciurus hudsonicus	Stable	Population clusters in the highlands of northern New Jersey and the Pine Barrens of southern New Jersey.
Meadow jumping mouse	Zapus hudsonius	Special concern	Common statewide, especially in grassy habitat.

== Extirpated species ==
Several mammal species were historically present in New Jersey but have been extirpated (made locally extinct) in recent centuries.

Extirpated species
Common name	Scientific name	Status in New Jersey	Notes
Moose	Alces alces	Extinct	Historically recorded in the northern parts of the state, extirpated in early colonial times from forest clearage and hunting.
American Bison	Bison bison	Extinct	Historical records of bison in New Jersey are scant, but some sources suggest that this was the eastern extent of their range prior to being overhunted.
Gray wolf	Canis lupus	Extinct	Wolves were historically common across New Jersey. The state placed a bounty on them beginning in 1675 and continuing for several decades. Hunting continued until wolves were extirpated by the early 19th Century.
Red wolf	Canis rufus	Extinct	Red wolves were once found in most of the state, likely alongside gray wolves, but they have since been extirpated.
Elk	Cervus canadensis	Extinct	Elk historically lived in the highlands of northern New Jersey and the Delaware Water Gap, and were sometimes found in the Delaware River Valley as far south as Trenton. They were hunted to extinction in the state in the late 18th or early 19th Century, although elk occasionally continued to enter from Pennsylvania through the 19th Century.
Snowshoe hare	Lepus americanus	Extinct	Historically recorded in New Jersey, determined to be nearly or fully extirpated by the early 20th Century.
American marten	Martes americana	Extinct	Historical records suggest that the American marten lived in New Jersey but is now extirpated.
Cougar	Puma concolor	Extinct	Cougars were once found across New Jersey, but were hunted to extirpation by 1840.
