= Geomyces =

Scientific classification
- Kingdom: Fungi
- Division: Ascomycota
- Class: Leotiomycetes
- Order: Helotiales
- Family: Myxotrichaceae
- Genus: Geomyces; Traaen (1914)

Type species
- Geomyces auratus Traaen (1914)

Genus of fungi

Geomyces is a genus of filamentous fungi in the family Myxotrichaceae. Members of the genus are widespread in distribution, especially in northern temperate regions. Known to be psychrotolerant and associated with Arctic permafrost soils, they are equally prevalent in the air of domestic dwellings, and children's sandpits. Species of Geomyces have previously been placed in the genus Chrysosporium.

== Description ==
This genus is characterized by short but distinct branched conidiophores that have chains of spores formed directly from the cells of the branches. Sometimes only the tips of the branches become spores. The spores (conidia) are 1-celled, and either white or yellow. The teleomorph of species in this genus, if they exist, are in Pseudogymnoascus or Gymnostellatospora.

Geomyces species are known to form ericoid mycorrhizae with the roots of alpine Ericales and other perennial hosts, helping these plants adapt to low-nutrient environments.

The Geomyces are keratinophilic fungi, able to degrade hairs and nails. They have been investigated for possible use in the biodecomposition of waste poultry feathers.

== Adaptive capabilities ==
Research has shown that laboratory cultures of G. pannorum isolated from various environments may have extreme differences in morphology and physiology. In fact, the limits of cold adaptation in a particular isolate can vary depending on the source of isolation, even though the isolates are genetically identical.

Studies suggest that one biochemical mechanism of low-temperature tolerance is achieved by altering the composition and total content of fatty-acids in their membrane, a phenomenon called homeoviscous adaptation.

== White-nose syndrome ==
A 2008 study of white-nose syndrome, a fungal infection causing high mortality rates in bats, determined that the fungus found on the muzzles, wings, and ears of infected bats is a member of the genus Geomyces. Later, the conidial morphology of this isolate was shown to be morphologically distinct from the conidia of other characterized members of the genus, despite the phylogenetic similarity. Finally, in spring 2009 the source of the infection was identified as a new species, Geomyces destructans. It is known however that Geomyces species are found in caves and bat hibernacula, and have been isolated from the cave cricket Troglophilus neglectus.

== Biocorrosion ==
Using phylogenetic analyses of ribosomal DNA sequences, Geomyces species have been implicated in the biodeterioration of antique and optical glass. Feeding off organic residues ubiquitously present on historical glass, such as dust or dead fungal and bacterial material, fungal colonization by Geomyces may ultimately lead to etching, pit corrosion, or the formation of cracks or patinas due to secretion of acidic metabolic byproducts, or penetration of fungal mycelia into the paint layer.

== Bioactive compounds ==
A number of asterric acid derivatives, some with antibacterial or antifungal activity, have been isolated from an unidentified Geomyces isolate found in a soil sample from King George Island, Antarctica: ethyl asterrate, n-butyl asterrate, and geomycins A-C.

== Species ==
- Geomyces asperulatus Sigler & J.W. Carmich. (1976)
- Geomyces auratus Traaen (1914)
- Geomyces cretaceus Traaen (1914)
- Geomyces destructans Gargas et al. (2009)
- Geomyces laevis Zhong Q. Li & C.Q. Cui (1989)
- Geomyces pannorum (Link) Sigler & J.W. Carmich. (1976) - This species is ubiquitous in soil, from temperate to Antarctic regions, and is the predominant micro-organism associated with the degradation of soil-buried polyester polyurethane in landfills. The variant G. pannorum var. pannorum is occasionally reported as an etiological agent of superficial infection of skin and nails in humans.
- Geomyces pulvereus A.D. Hocking & Pitt (1988)
- Geomyces sulphureus Traaen
- Geomyces vinaceus Dal Vesco (1957)

Named for the purplish-red or vinaceous colony color. The teleomorph form is Pseudogymnoascus roseus.
