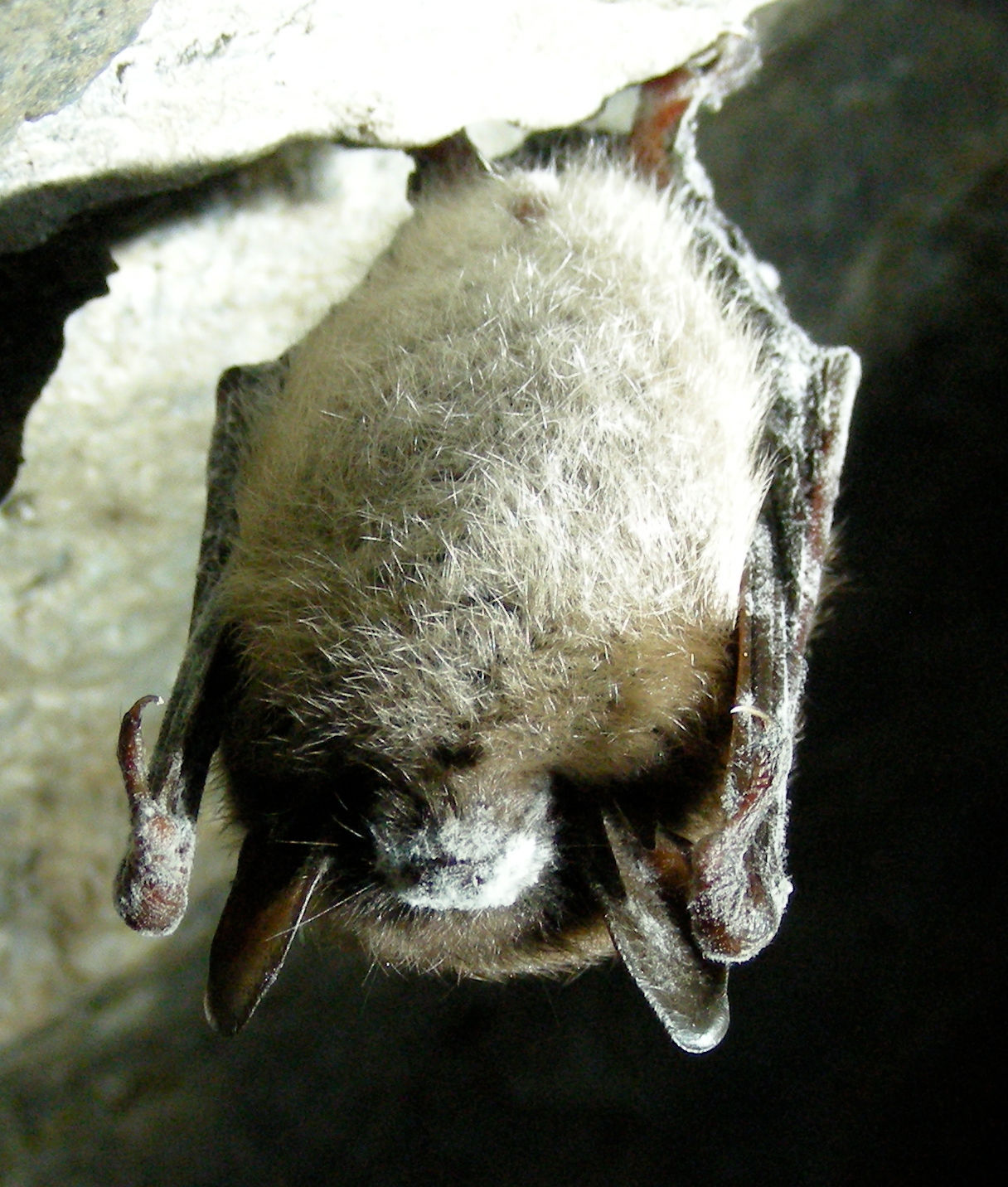
- In white nose syndrome, Pseudogymnoascus destructans can be found growing on the muzzle, wing, and ear of bats, in this case, a little brown bat.

Scientific classification
- Kingdom: Fungi
- Division: Ascomycota
- Class: Leotiomycetes
- Order: Thelebolales
- Family: Pseudeurotiaceae
- Genus: Pseudogymnoascus
- Species: P. destrucans

Binomial name
- Pseudogymnoascus destrucans (Blehert & Gargas) Minnis & D. L. Lindner

Synonyms
- Geomyces destructans Blehert et al. 2008

= Pseudogymnoascus destructans =

Species of fungus

Pseudogymnoascus destructans (formerly known as Geomyces destructans) is a psychrophilic (cold-loving) fungus that causes white-nose syndrome (WNS), a fatal disease that has devastated bat populations in parts of the United States and Canada. Unlike species of Geomyces, P. destructans forms asymmetrically curved conidia. Pseudogymnoascus destructans grows very slowly on artificial media and cannot grow at temperatures above 20 °C. It can grow around 4 °C to 20 °C, which encompasses the temperatures found in winter bat hibernacula.

Emaciation is considered the ultimate cause of mortality for the bats who are infected with Pseudogymnoascus destructans. The disease causes a disruption in the normal hibernation cycle where the animal is in a state of torpor and leads to the bats arising from their hibernaculum too early and depleting their fat supply.

== History ==
In 2008, Blehert et al. described the fungus associated with white-nose syndrome as a member of the genus Geomyces. In 2009, Gargas et al. were the first to describe the fungus as a unique species; the specific name they chose, "destructans", means "destroying". The fungus was definitively identified as the cause of the syndrome in bats, according to research published in 2011 by scientists at the United States Geological Survey. It was previously unknown whether this fungus was the primary cause of WNS or was an opportunistic pathogen associated with the disease, though strong evidence suggested that the fungus was the etiologic agent. In 2013, an analysis of the phylogenetic relationship indicated that this fungus was more closely related to the genus Pseudogymnoascus than to the genus Geomyces changing its Latin binomial to Pseudogymnoascus destructans.

== Distribution ==
Pseudogymnoascus destructans is believed to originate from Europe. The current P. destructans European distribution includes Austria, Belgium, Czech Republic, Denmark, Estonia, France, Germany, Hungary, the Netherlands, Poland, Romania, Slovakia, Switzerland, Turkey, Ukraine and the United Kingdom.

The levels of mortality in bat populations within the European distribution are shown to be lower, this is likely due to Eurasian bats having extended coevolution with the pathogen. The North American populations are showing signs of recovery in devastated populations, suggesting that the fungus or hosts or both are undergoing processes that can eventually lead to coexistence in the North American populations.

The North American geographic distribution of P. destructans continues to increase each year since its initial introduction to New York State in 2006. Its current distribution includes 38 states in the U.S.A. and at least 7 Canadian provinces.

== Bat species affected by P. destructans ==
In North America, P. destructans has been found to infect at least eleven species of bats, of which it has caused diagnostic symptoms of white-nose syndrome in the endangered Indiana bat (Myotis sodalis), the endangered gray bat (Myotis grisescens), the endangered little brown bat (Myotis lucifugus), the northern long-eared bat (Myotis septentrionalis), the big brown bat (Eptesicus fuscus), the tri-colored bat (Perimyotis subflavus), and the eastern small-footed bat (Myotis leibii). Pseudogymnoascus destructans has been found on four additional North American bat species: the endangered Virginia big-eared bat (Corynorhinus townsendii virginianus), the cave bat (Myotis velifer), the Silver-haired bat (Lasionycteris noctivagans), and the South-eastern bat (Myotis austroriparius). The European bat species that have been shown to harbour P. destructans include Bechstein's bat (Myotis bechsteinii), Lesser mouse-eared bat (Myotis blythii oxygnathus), Brandt's bat (Myotis brandtii), pond bat (Myotis dasycneme), Daubenton's bat (Myotis daubentonii), Greater mouse-eared bat (Myotis myotis), whiskered bat (Myotis mystacinus), Geoffroy's bat (Myotis emarginatus), Northern bat (Eptesicus nilssonii), Lesser horseshoe bat (Rhinolophus hipposideros), Barbastell (Barbastella barbastellus), Brown long-eared bat (Plecotus auritus) and Natterer's bat (Myotis nattereri), although large-scale European bat related fatalities are not reported.

== Biology ==
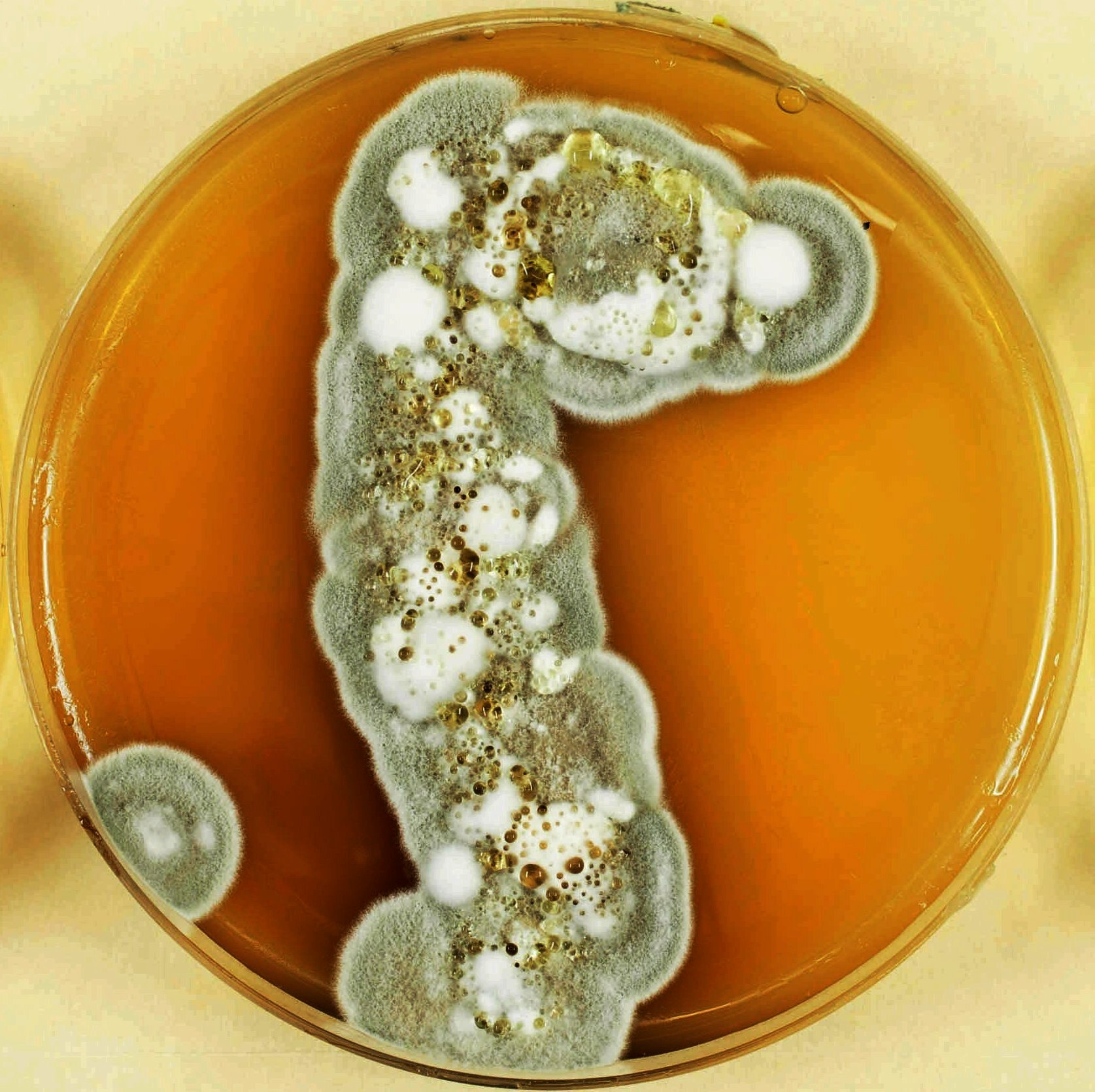
Typical grey colony of Pseudogymnoascus destructans on Sabouraud dextrose agar.

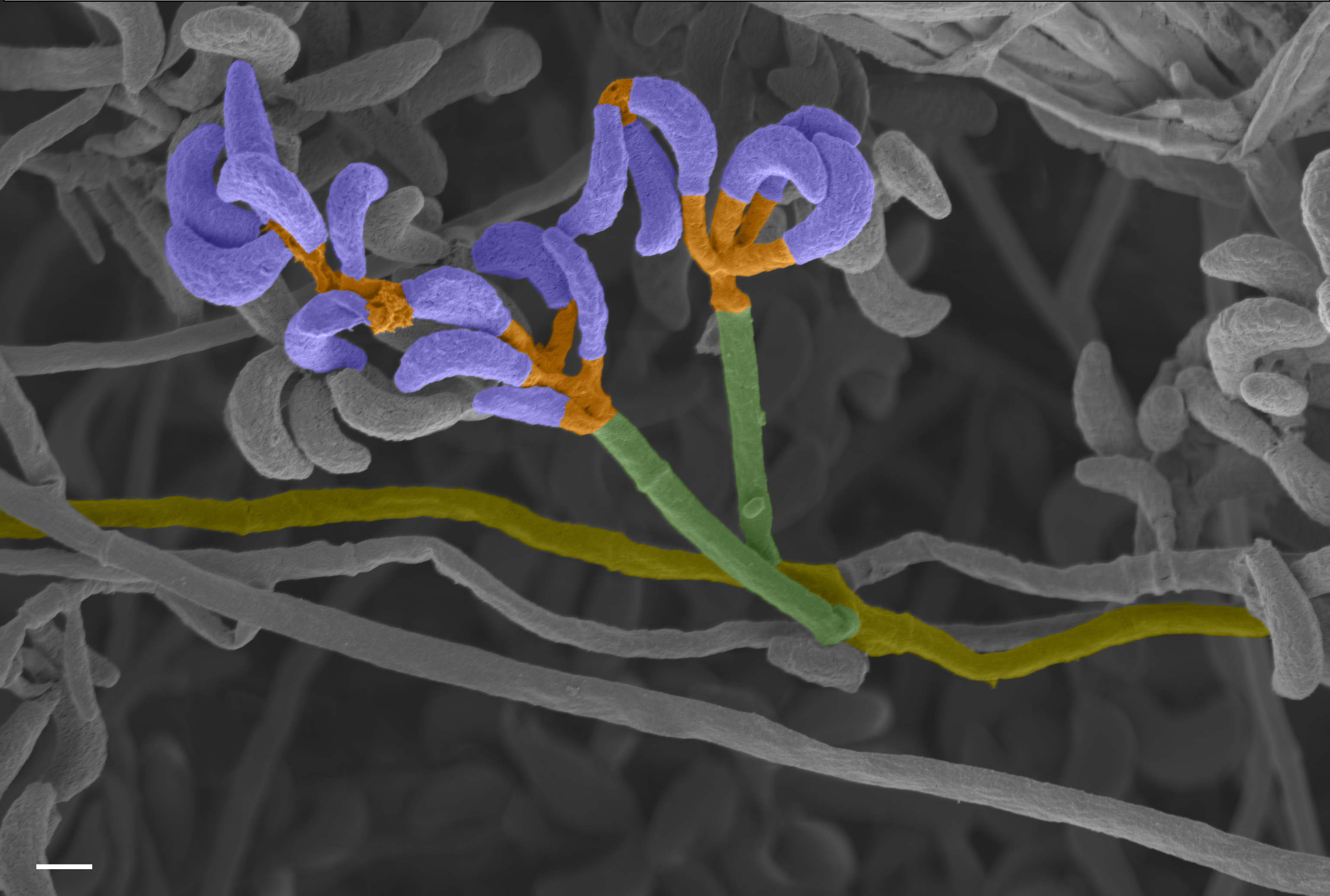
Pseudogymnoascus destructans in culture demonstrating characteristic curved conidia in blue/purple. (false color SEM image)

P. destructans is a psychrophilic fungus, able to grow below 10 °C (50 °F) and with an upper limit near 20 °C (68 °F). This fungus produces brown and grey colonies, secretes a brownish pigment and reproduces asexually via characteristically curved conidia when cultured on Sabaouraud dextrose agar. The asymmetrically curved conidia are produced at the tips or sides singly or in short chains. Arthroconidia can be present and undergo rhexolytic separation. Research has shown that P. destructans grows optimally between 12.5 and 15.8 °C (54.5 and 60.4 °F), with an upper growth limit of about 20 °C (68 °F). The in vitro growth rate of P. destructans is reported to be very slow; however, several studies have shown that not all P. destructans isolates grow at the same rate. P. destructans grows as an opportunistic pathogen on bats, causing white-nose syndrome, but it can also persist in the cave environment, as a saprotroph. P. destructans can grow and sporulate (reproduce asexually via conidiation) on keratinaceous, chitinaceous, cellulosic, and lipid/protein rich substrates including dead fish, mushroom fruit bodies and dead insects. P. destructans has been shown to utilize many nitrogen sources: nitrate, nitrite, ammonium, urea, and uric acid. Although P. destructans can penetrate senescing moss cells, cellulosic debris may not be a long term substrate for colonization. P. destructans can tolerate elevated levels of environmental inhibitory sulfur compounds (cysteine, sulfite, and sulfide), grow over a wide pH range (pH 5-11), tolerate elevated environmental levels of calcium; however, P. destructans was found to be intolerant to matric-induced water stress.

=== Enzymatic activity ===
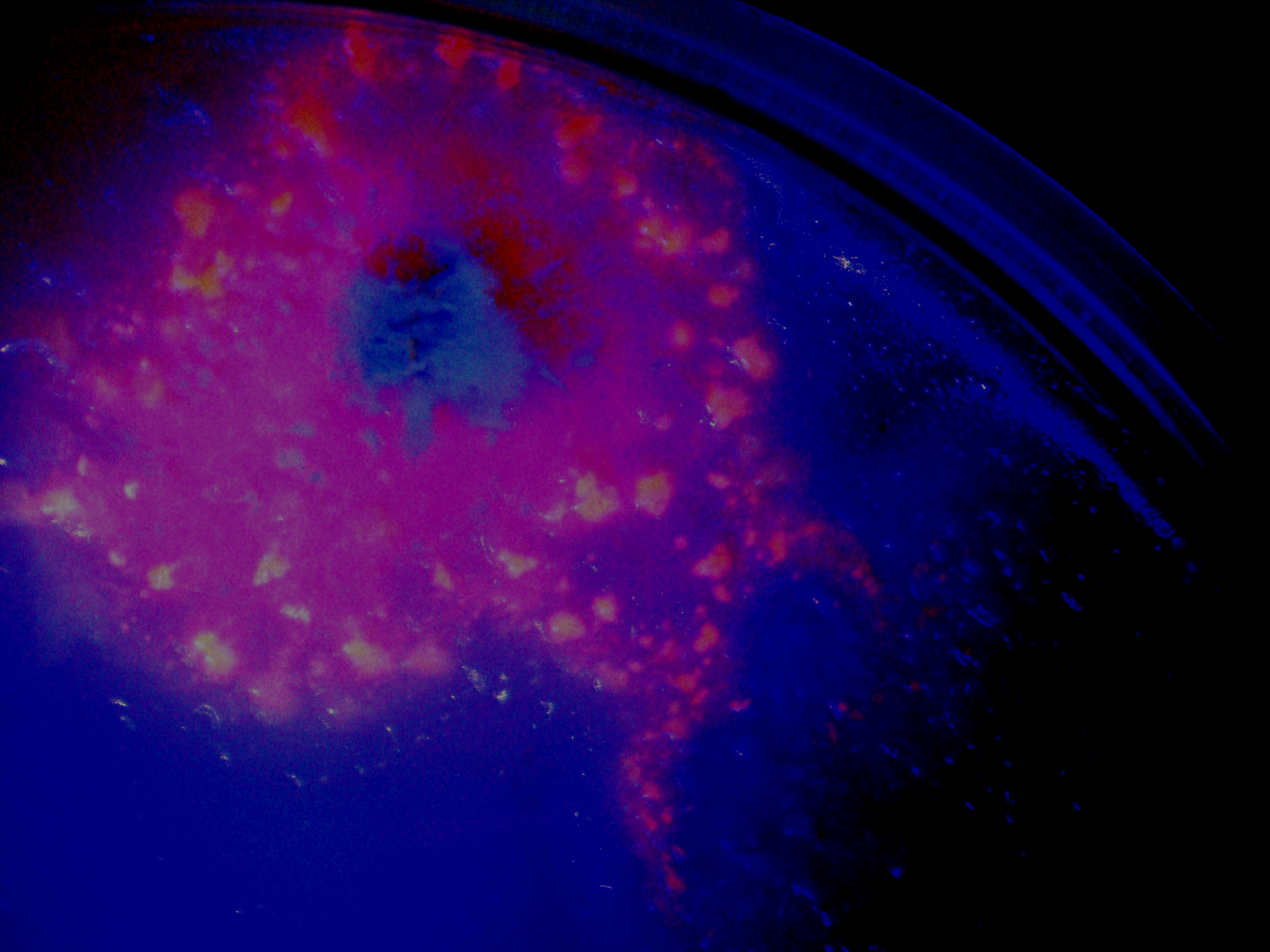
Pseudogymnoascus destructans demonstrating lipase activity on Rhodamine B agar.

Under laboratory conditions, P. destructans has been shown to produce numerous enzymes including β-glucosidase, esterase/esterase lipase/lipase, leucine and valine arylamidase, N-acetyl-β-glucosaminidase, naphthol-AS-B1-phosphohydrolase, both acid and alkaline phosphatases, various proteinase, and urease, while testing negative for cystine arylamidase, α-chymotrypsin, alpha/beta-galactosidase, β-glucuronidase, α-fucosidase, α-mannosidase, and trypsin. Important dual virulence factors found in P. destructans and many other pathogenic fungi include urease, proteinase (aspartyll) and superoxide dismutase.

== Control agents ==
In 2011, several compounds (antifungals, fungicides, and biocides) were shown to effectively inhibit the growth of P. destructans including benzalkonium chloride, chloroacetoxyquinoline, chloroxine, ciclopirox olamine, econazole, phenylmercuric acetate, pyrithione zinc and sulconazole. The same study showed that P. destructans was sensitive to Amphotericin B, itraconazole, ketoconazole, posaconazole and voriconazole, while the fungus had some resistance to anidulafungin, caspofungin, flucytosine and micafungin. A recent study (2014) identified several volatile organic compounds (benzaldehyde, benzothiazole, decanal, nonanal, N,N-dimethyloctylamine, and 2-ethyl-1-hexanol) that were previously identified from fungistatic soils, which demonstrated inhibition of both mycelial extension and growth from conidia.

A 2015 study showed that Rhodococcus rhodochrous could inhibit the growth of P. destructans.

A positive breakthrough may have come while utilizing competitive genetics to investigate the evolutionary history of P. destructans compared to six closely related nonpathogenic species. The study published in the journal Nature Communications in 2018 discovered that due to a lost enzyme, P. destructans lacks an ability to repair DNA which has been damaged by ultraviolet (UV) light. Ongoing research is taking place to see if there is a practical method to have bats activate a UV system as they enter and leave a hibernaculum and treat their infection. While not a long term solution, it may be enough to avoid population collapse allowing the species to evolve its own defenses to the fungus as Eurasian bats have.
