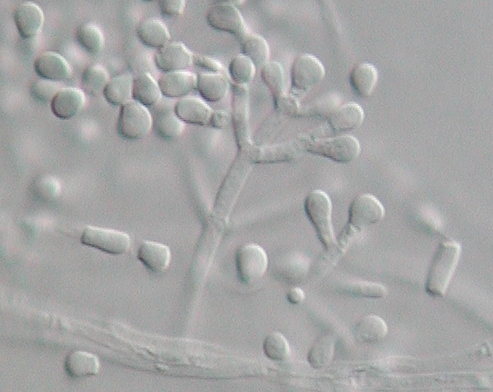

Scientific classification
- Kingdom: Fungi
- Division: Ascomycota
- Class: Eurotiomycetes
- Order: Onygenales
- Family: Myxotrichaceae
- Genus: Geomyces
- Species: G. pannorum

Binomial name
- Geomyces pannorum (Link) Sigler & J.W. Carmich. (1976)

Synonyms
- Sporotrichum pannorum Link (1824); Chrysosporium pannorum (Link) Hughes (1958); Geomyces pannorus (Link) Sigler & J.W. Carmich. (1976)

= Geomyces pannorum =

Species of fungus

Geomyces pannorum is a yellow-brown filamentous fungus of the phylum Ascomycota commonly found in cold soil environments including the permafrost of the Northern hemisphere. A ubiquitous soil fungus, it is the most common species of the genus Geomyces; which also includes G. vinaceus and G. asperulatus. Geomyces pannorum has been identified as an agent of disfigurement of pigments used in the 15,000-year-old paintings on the walls of the Lascaux caves of France. Strains of Geomyces have been recovered from the permafrost tunnel in Fox, Alaska and radiocarbon dated to between 14,000 and 30,000 years old.

== Taxonomy ==
The fungus Geomyces pannorum was originally described as Sporotrichum pannorum from rotten cloth in Germany by Johann Heinrich Friedrich Link in 1824. It was transferred to the genus Chrysosporium by the Canadian mycologist Stanley Hughes in 1958; however, the asymmetry and relatively small size of the conidia combined with the tree-like, branched appearance of the asexual reproductive structures suggested it belonged elsewhere. In 1976 the fungus was transferred to the genus Geomyces as Geomyces pannorum by Canadian mycologists Lynne Sigler and John William Carmichael.

== Ecology ==
Geomyces pannorum is a temperate soil fungus often associated with cold temperatures. It has been isolated from Arctic permafrost as well as the soils of Antarctica. Geomyces pannorum has also been recovered from glacier bank soils in Kashmir, India, at an elevation of over 3000 metres, where temperatures rarely exceed 10 °C. This species can survive in arctic cryopegs consisting of super-cooled hypersaline liquid water deposits found beneath or within large masses of ice. Geomyces pannorum has also been associated with Antarctic marine macroalgae and deep-sea ecosystems. It is one of the most common fungi isolated in these environments, which suggests that they are involved in decomposition and nutrient-cycling in cold marine ecosystems. Geomyces pannorum is tolerant of up to three times the salinity of seawater. This fungus maintains cell and membrane function at low temperatures by elevating levels of unsaturated fats and compounds with cryoprotectant properties such as trehalose and various polyols. The enzyme systems also retain function at low temperature.

Other reported substrates include debris from a coal mine in Canada, frozen leaf litter, meat, cod, gelatin, and flour. The species is also known from indoor environments where it has been found growing on damp walls, floors of gymnasiums, and on paper in archives and libraries. Geomyces pannorum has commonly been isolated from the hairs of burrowing mammals, the feathers of petrels, skuas, and penguins, and the exoskeletons of flying arthropods, all of which may contribute to its dispersal.

== Morphology ==
Colonies of G. pannorum are yellow-brown in colour, and typically have a granular, powdery texture produced by microscopic, tree-like sporulating structures. The conidia of this fungus are small, wedge-shaped with a flat base. They are smooth or slightly rough-walled, and tend to swell slightly during maturation. Conidia develop at the tips and along the sides of branched, tree-like conidiophores. The angles of conidiophore branches tend to be less than 90°. The conidia are formed in short chains of two to four arthroconidia linked together by empty intervening cells. The conidiophores of G. pannorum have verticils, which resemble branches radiating around a central, perpendicular main branch. The conidiophores and vegetative hyphae of G. pannorum are hyaline. Members of the genus Chrysosporium differ in having larger conidia and acutely branched conidiophores.

== Growth and metabolism ==
Geomyces pannorum is a slow-growing psychrophile, exhibiting growth below 0 °C to as low as −20 °C. Strains recovered from Antarctic cryopegs germinate at −2 °C two to three weeks after inoculation. Grow is typically observed at 25 °C but absent at 37 °C. The fatty acid composition and metabolism of this species changes in response to environmental temperature. As well, cultures isolated from different places exhibit differing morphological characteristics and varying rates of glucose and lipid utilization. Geomyces pannorum var. vinaceous grows at 4 °C and uses lipids more readily than glucose, possibly as a means to maintain membrane fluidity under low temperature conditions by increasing the proportion of unsaturated fatty acids. In contrast, G. pannorum var. pannorum grows at 25 °C and exhibits a nutritional preference for glucose.

Strains of G. pannorum are halotolerant, moderately cellulolytic, and able to survive and grow in the presence of multiple environmental stressors. This species is generally regarded to be keratinophilic (exhibiting a proclivity to grow on shed keratin) and accordingly produces keratinases. Sodium chloride is stimulatory to its growth on Czapek's medium (a growth medium in which sodium nitrate is the sole source of nitrogen and sucrose is source of carbon). Growth has been observed in low oxygen environments. Geomyces pannorum is resistant to the antifungal agent cycloheximide. However the growth of this species is inhibited by ultraviolet(UV)-B light.

Although most Geomyces species remain dormant until the introduction into their environment of new organic material, G. pannorum is unique in its ability to grow on silica gel in the absence of organic material. It produces a range of extracellular hydrolases including lipase, chitinase, and urease. It has been reported as a saprotroph on the colonies of other fungi including Cladosporium sphaerospermum.

== Clinical importance ==
Geomyces pannorum is regular contaminant found in cultures of dermatological specimens of humans and domestic animals (dogs, cats, horses). It is also encountered in respiratory specimens from humans and animals where its presence is similarly interpreted as clinically insignificant. A case of skin infection over the upper trunk and arms of a healthy, non-immunocompromised man was reported, as was a case of recurrent cutaneous G. pannorum infection was reported in three brothers with ichthyosis. However the several cases where Geomyces pannorum has been implicated in infection are suspected to be erroneous.

Geomyces pannorum produces bioactive metabolites some of which may have pharmaceutical potential. For example, pannomycin is structurally similar to a compound known to inhibit the ATPase, SecA, in the bacterial translocase pathway. Additional metabolites have been isolated from G. pannorum including antimicrobial asterric acid derivatives called "geomycins" active against Aspergillus fumigatus as well as Gram-positive and Gram-negative bacteria. Other metabolites have shown activity against Pseudomonas aeruginosa, Clavibacter michiganensis, Xanthomonas campestris and the causative agent of plant crown gall tumours, Agrobacterium tumefaciens.

== Industrial importance ==
Fungal 18S rDNA fragments of G. pannorum have been recovered from glass panels of 19th century churches in Brakel, Germany, where their presence was interpreted to contribute to have degradation. Minimal organic films on optical glass provide sufficient nutrition to sustain growth of this species, causing etching of the glass surface. Geomyces pannorum has been implicated in the biodegradation of buried plastics such as polyester polyurethane. It is capable of degrading plasticized polyvinyl chloride (pPVC) and polyurethane resins.
