= Pseudeurotium ovale =

Scientific classification
- Kingdom: Fungi
- Division: Ascomycota
- Class: Leotiomycetes
- Order: Thelebolales
- Family: Pseudeurotiaceae
- Genus: Pseudeurotium
- Species: P. ovale

Binomial name
- Pseudeurotium ovale Mycotaxon: Doveri (2013)

Synonyms
- Pleuroascus ovalis Mycobank: Stolk (1973); Pseudeurotium ovale var. ovale GBIF: Stolk (1955); Pseudeurotium ovale var. milkoi GBIF: Stolk (1955)

Species of fungus

Pseudeurotium ovale is a species of fungus.

== History and taxonomy ==
Pseudeurotium ovale was first classified by Amelia C. Stolk in 1954. It was assigned to the genus Pseudeurotium, along with thirteen other species. It was initially classified as a member of the family Eurotiaceae, but was reclassified forty years later by Malloch and Cain to its current family, Pseudeurotiaceae. Further more recent studies indicated that P. ovale could be classified as incertae sedis, as a result of analysis of conserved regions of its genome. Pseudeurotium ovale was originally identified on Jersey, an island in the English Channel, but has since been isolated in various regions, including Japan, South Africa, Italy and Sweden. Pseudeurotium ovale has been classified as a saprotroph, as it can thrive in a diverse set of environments, including soil, faeces and oatmeal agar. In some instances, growths on the nematode Heterodera or Globodera rostochiensis have contained P. ovale.

== Growth and morphology ==
Pseudeurotium ovale is a member of the Ascomycota, and therefore the fruiting body of P. ovale is called an ascocarp. Pseudeurotium ovale has a cleisothecium, or a fruiting body with a round shape. The membrane of the cleisothecium is continuous, and the spore-bearing structures or asci, lack germ pores. These normally allow germ tubes to exit the ascospores after they disperse from the fruiting body, and germination begins. The fungus germinates every 24 to 48 hours, and where the germ tube exits the fungal spores has yet to be identified. P. ovale is very similar in appearance to both Cleistothelebolus nipigonensis and Cephalotheca palearum, however there are slight differences between their physical characteristics that make them identifiable. The multilayered cell wall of Cephalotheca and the faecal-restricted growth environment for C. nipigonensis distinguish these fungi from P. ovale.

=== Physiology ===
The smooth, dark brown, oval-shaped spores of Pseudeurotium ovale are unique compared to other members of the species. The spore-bearing structures or asci are randomly distributed throughout the ascocarp in groups of eight. They also range from being seven to nine microns in width, and six to eight microns in length. The diameter of the fruiting body of P. ovale can be anywhere from 90 to 250 micrometers. The tissue of its single layer peridium is described as being densely packed into irregular columns and rows of cells. The cell wall of P. ovale spores are thin, growing into hyphae with no discernible septa. Pseudeurotium ovale grows well below human body temperature, at around 25 °C. An asexual state of P. ovale has also been identified, and has been classified as sympodial. The asexual spores or conidia of P. ovale form around three days after germination.

== Pathology ==
Pseudeurotium ovale has not been found to be causative in human disease. It has only ever been identified in a few cases of onychomycosis of the toe nails in elderly individuals. Finger nails are very rarely infected by P. ovale. In instances of P. ovale colonization of toenails, it was found with a dermatophyte, such as Trichophyton rubrum, or in an immunocompromised individual. The nail appearance was severely altered, presenting with discolouration, and had lost their structural integrity. In one infection, the dermatophyte Trichophyton rubrum was identified as the causative agent. Pseudeurotium ovale has also been found with Cephalosporium sp. in cases of onychomycosis; however their role in disease was unclear.

== Medical applications ==
Some toxins produced by Pseudeurotium ovale have been found to have antimicrobial effects, and can act ton the immune response, dampening it in some cases. Ovalicin is a secondary metabolite, produced by the mycelium. Its main component is β-trans-bergamotene, a volatile organic compound in sesquiterpene class. Environmental stressors, such as competition with other fungi or nutrient deprivation, can trigger P. ovale to produce ovalicin as a response. Past studies have demonstrated the potential for ovalicin as a tumour suppressing drug, as it targets methionine aminopeptidase type 2. This protein is common to endothelial cells and is necessary for the formation of new blood vessels, which allow tumour growth. β-trans-begamotene is also produced by Aspergillus fumigatus.
