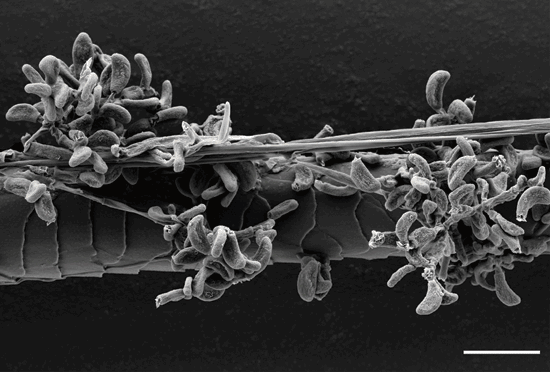
- A bat hair colonized by Pseudogymnoascus destructans

Scientific classification
- Kingdom: Fungi
- Division: Ascomycota
- Class: Leotiomycetes
- Order: Thelebolales
- Family: Pseudeurotiaceae
- Genus: Pseudogymnoascus; Raillo (1929)

Type species
- Pseudogymnoascus roseus Raillo (1929)

Species
- P. alpinus; P. appendiculatus; P. bhattii; P. caucasicus; P. destructans; P. roseus; P. verrucocus

= Pseudogymnoascus =

Genus of fungi

Pseudogymnoascus is a genus of fungi in the family Pseudeurotiaceae.

== History ==
It was circumscribed by A. Raillo in 1929 for two species, P. roseus and P. vinaceus. No type specimens were retained by Raillo. In 1972, Samson designated a neotype for P. roseus, recognized three species (P. roseus Raillo, P. bhattii Samson and P. caucasicus Cejp & Milko) and synonymized P. vinaceus with P. roseus. In 1982, Müller described a fourth species, P. alpinus. In 2006, Rice and Currah described two additional species, P. appendiculatus and P. verrucosus. In 2013, Geomyces destructans the casual agent of bat white nose syndrome was transferred to this genus and is now referred to as P. destructans. Since 2006, intensive cave sampling has identified numerous Pseudogymnoascus isolates that have yet to be described.

== Species characteristics ==
Pseudogymnoascus alpinus Müller ascospores are described as navicular-fusiform in shape and hyaline to yellow in color. Typically, one side of the ascospore is flattened with 3 longitudinal rims. Müller collected P. alpinus from soil below Winter Heath in Switzerland.

Pseudogymnoascus appendiculatus Rice & Currah differs from other Pseudogymnoascus species by the presence of long, pigmented, branched peridial appendages. The ascospores have a longitudinal rim or are otherwise described as smooth. This species was initially isolated from rotten black spruce wood found under Sphagnum peat in Canada.

Pseudogymnoascus bhattii Samson has single-celled, hyaline to yellow fusiform ascospores which are described as flattened on one side. No anamorph (asexual state) was described. Samson isolated this species from alpine tundra soil in Canada and Alaska and stated that it could grow from 10 °C to 25 °C.

Pseudogymnoascus caucasicus Cejp & Milko described this species as having stalked chlamydospore-like structures and no ascomata. This species was initially isolated from forest soil in Georgia. In 1982, Müller noted that the type culture was sterile.

Pseudogymnoascus destructans Minnis & Lindner was initially described in 2009 as Geomyces destructans by Gargas et al. In 2013, further analysis of the phylogenetic relationship moved this species to the genus Pseudogymnoascus. The conidium of this species are hyaline and characteristically curved.

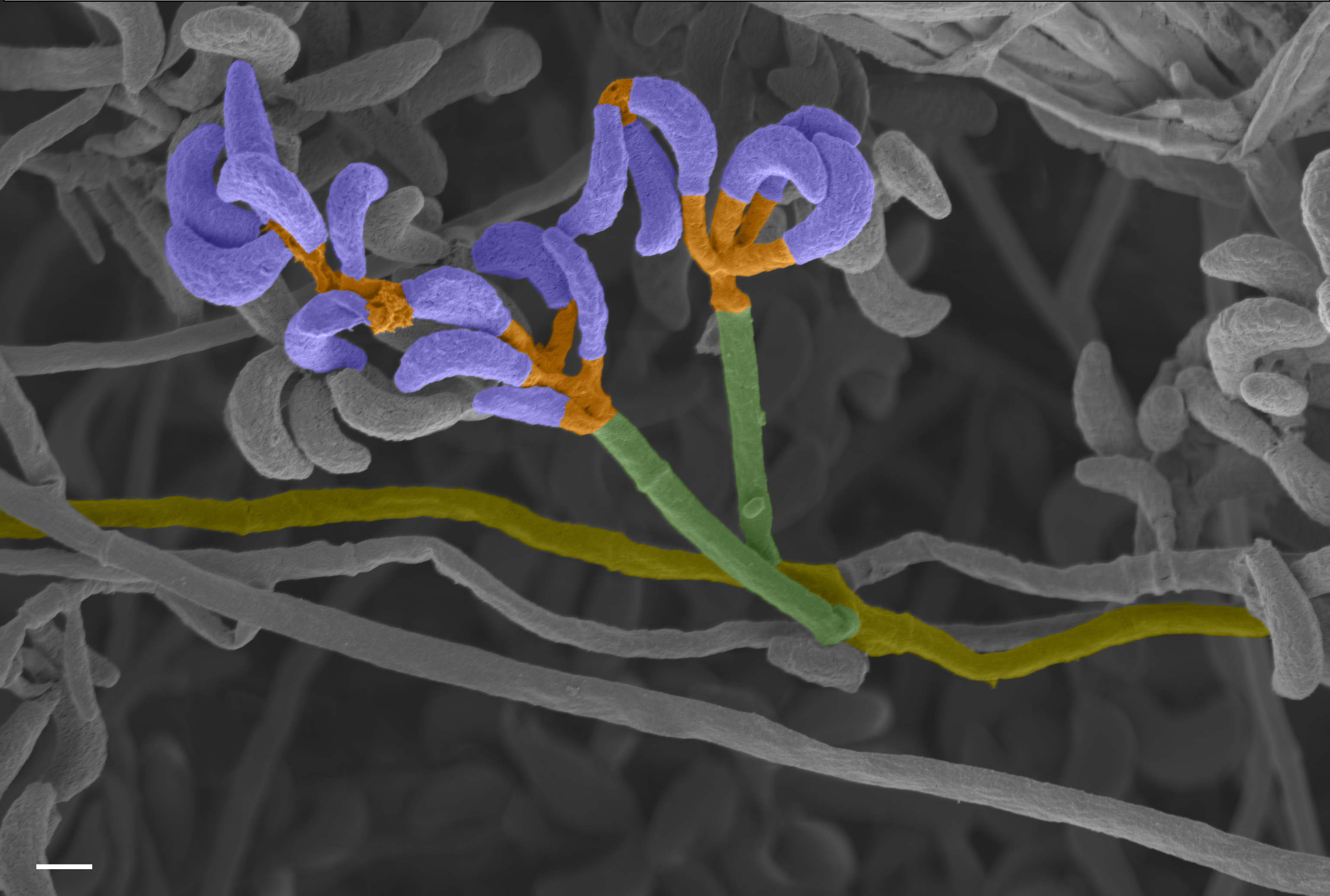
Pseudogymnoascus destructans in culture demonstrating characteristic curved conidia in blue/purple.

This species was first isolated from infected hibernating bats in New York state. Recently, this species has been isolated from cave environments no longer inhabited by hibernating bats.

Pseudogymnoascus roseus Raillo has smooth ascospores that are ellipsoid to fusiform and can vary from yellow to reddish brown. Conidia are typically hyaline in color and globose to ellipsoid in shape. The base of the conidia are truncate. Pseudogymnoascus roseus is frequently isolated from soil, root and wood samples.

Pseudogymnoascus verrucosus Rice & Currah is distinguished by the presence of warts that covers the ascospore surface. In contrast, the conidia are described as smooth to asperulate. This species was also isolated from the same substrate and locality as Pseudogymnoascus appendiculatus.

== Ecology ==
Many Pseudogymnoascus species are cellulolytic, function as saprotrophs and are either psychrophilic or psychrotolerant. Pseudogymnoascus roseus was able to form an ericoid mycorrhizal association in vitro and Pseudogymnoascus destructans infects hibernating bat and survives in the cave environment as a saprotroph. Müller indicated that all known Pseudogymnoascus species, prior to 1982, were not known to be keratinolytic.
