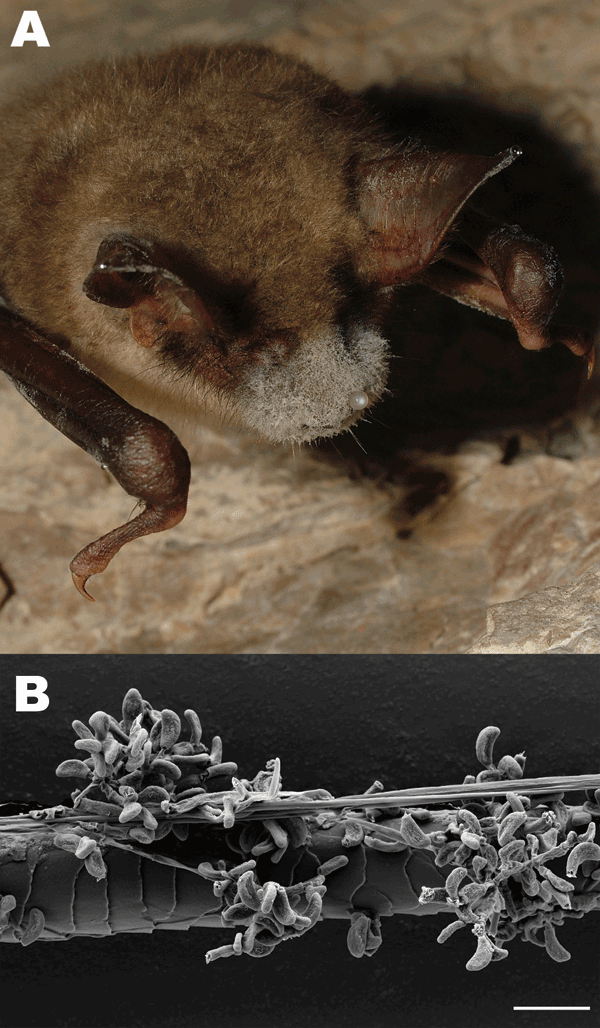
- A) Greater mouse-eared bat (Myotis myotis) with white fungal growth. B) Scanning electron micrograph of a bat hair colonized by Pseudogymnoascus destructans. Scale bar=10 μm

Scientific classification
- Kingdom: Fungi
- Division: Ascomycota
- Class: Leotiomycetes
- Order: Thelebolales
- Family: Pseudeurotiaceae; Malloch & Cain (1970)

Type genus
- Pseudeurotium J.F.H.Beyma (1937)

Genera
- Connersia; Leuconeurospora; Levispora; Neelakesa – tentative Pleuroascus; Pseudeurotium; Pseudogymnoascus; Teberdinia

= Pseudeurotiaceae =

Family of fungi

The Pseudeurotiaceae are a family of fungi in the division Ascomycota. This family can not yet be taxonomically classified in any of the ascomycetous classes and orders with any degree of certainty (incertae sedis).

== General characteristics ==
The general characteristics for members within this family include hyaline or brown ascospores, within a thin-walled ascus inside a cleistothecial ascomata.

== See also ==
- List of Ascomycota families incertae sedis
