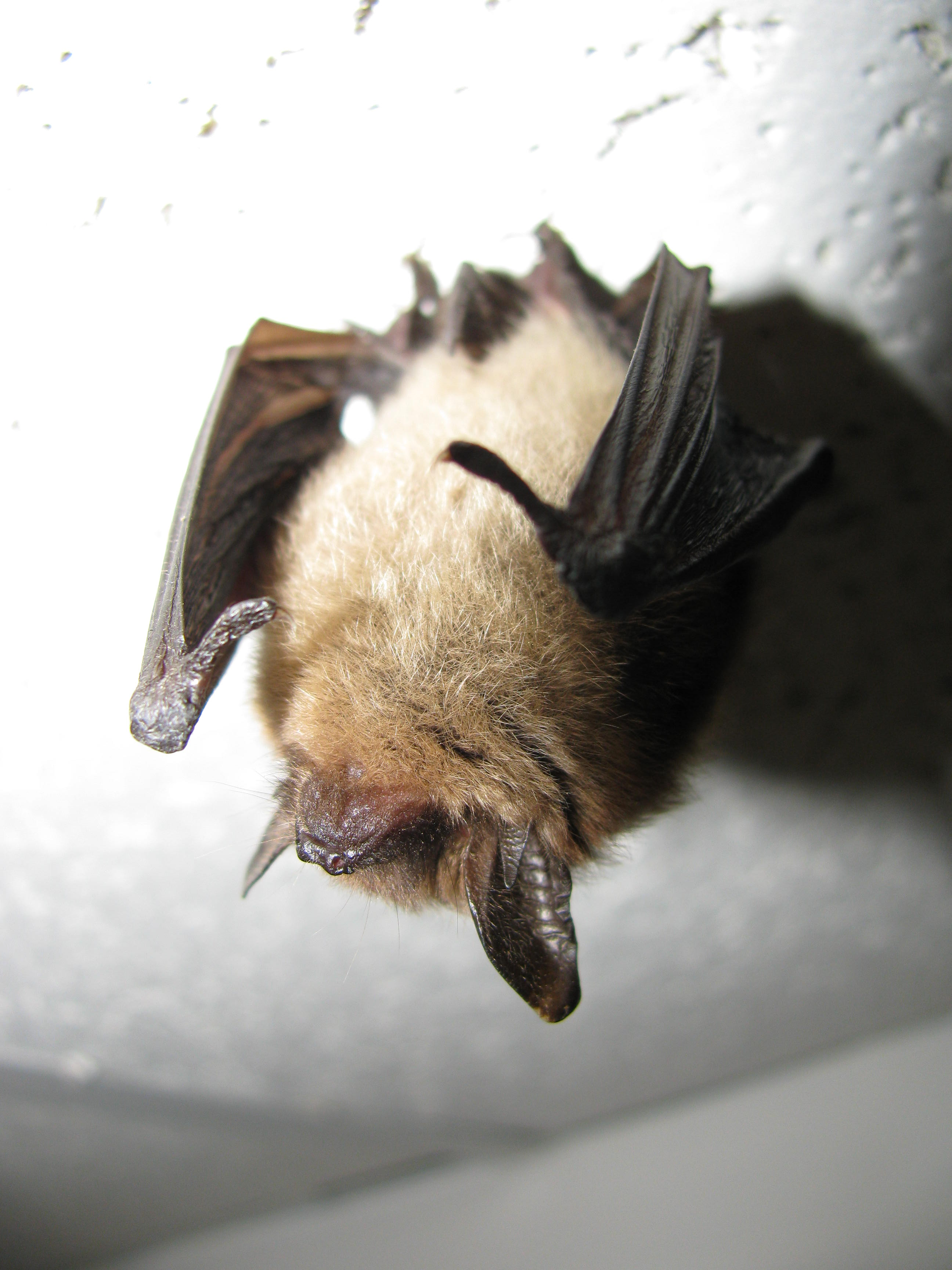

Conservation status
- Near Threatened (IUCN 3.1)

- Endangered (ESA)

Scientific classification
- Kingdom: Animalia
- Phylum: Chordata
- Class: Mammalia
- Order: Chiroptera
- Family: Vespertilionidae
- Genus: Myotis
- Species: M. septentrionalis

Binomial name
- Myotis septentrionalis Trouessart, 1897
- Range of M. septentrionalis

Synonyms
- Myotis keenii septentrionalis

= Myotis septentrionalis =

Species of mammal

Myotis septentrionalis, known as the northern long-eared bat or northern myotis, is a species of bat native to North America. There are no recognized subspecies. The northern long-eared bat is about 3–3.7 inches in length, with a wingspan of 9–10 inches. It is distinguishable by its long ears when comparing it to other bats in its genus. This species is commonly found in the northern United States and Southern Canada east of British Columbia. The geographic range includes 37 states.

== Description ==
The northern long-eared bat is a small bat, measuring an average of 8.6 cm (3.4 in) in total length, including a tail about 4 cm (1.6 in) long. Adults weigh between 5 and 8 g (0.18 and 0.28 oz). The fur and wing membranes are light brown in color, and the bat lacks the dark shoulder spots found in the closely related, and otherwise similar Keen's myotis (Myotis keenii). Compared to other Myotis species, these bats have long ears with a relatively long, pointed tragus; when folded forwards the ears extend well past the nose. They also have a longer tail and larger wing area than most comparably sized Myotis bats, giving them increased maneuverability during slow flight.

== Distribution and habitat ==
Northern long-eared bats are found through much of the eastern half of the United States and Canada from Manitoba and Newfoundland in the north to North Carolina and Alabama in the south. They are also rarely found in western parts of Canada, sometimes as far as the western borders of British Columbia and Yukon. They are found primarily in forested habitats, especially boreal forests, as they typically roost in hardwood trees during the summer.

Within big cities such as Long Island, New York; Washington, D.C; and Toronto, Canada, healthy maternity communities of Northern long-eared bats forage solely along forest edges and within the forest interior. Maternity colonies consist of female, reproductive northern long-eared bats that assemble in tree cavities. The habitat selection preference of reproductive females is vital when considering the rebuilding of their population, as they must take the opportunity to ensure the area they choose allows them to regulate their body temperatures and not overextend their energy when nurturing offspring. Large trees with consistent, localized atmospheric conditions are the ideal colonization spots; the larger the trees, the larger the colony size it can store. Lactating females, in contrast to pregnant females, specifically identified Ponderosa pines as their preferred roosting location. Post-partum northern long-eared bats roost in smaller groups than the ones they roosted in while pregnant.

== Biology and behavior ==
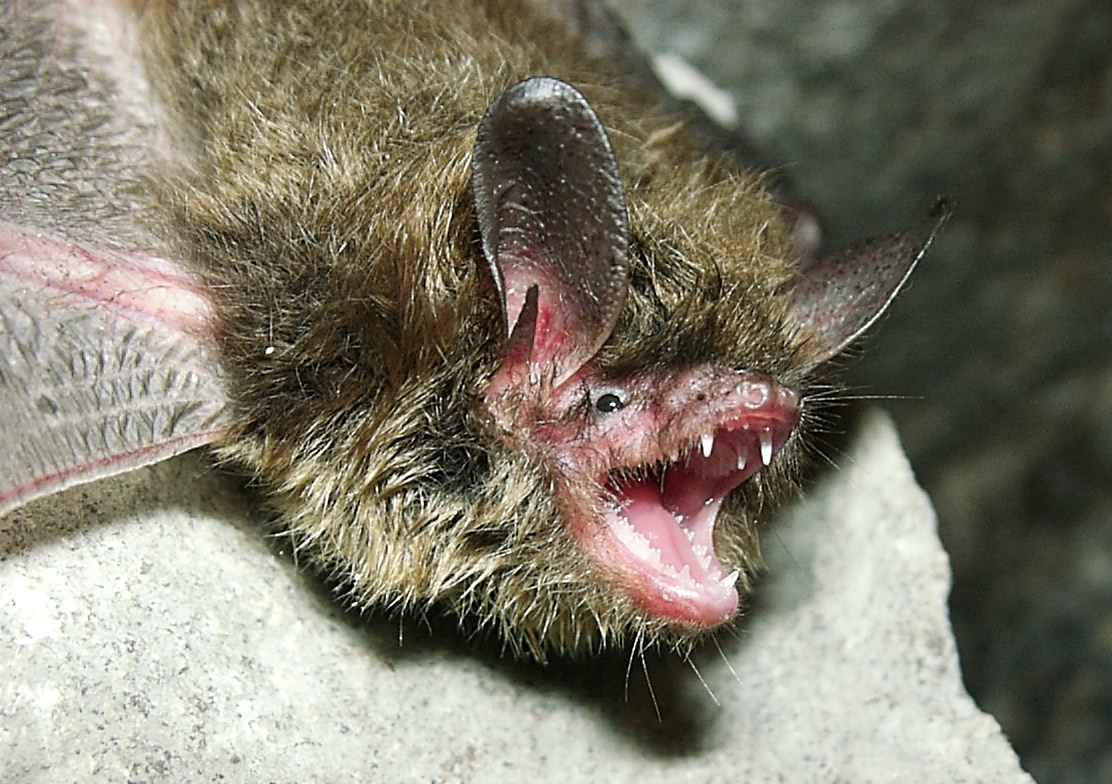
A northern long-eared bat in southern Indiana Scientists studying Northern long-eared bats collect swab samples from those presenting with symptoms of white nose syndrome.

During the spring and summer, northern long-eared bats spend the day roosting in trees or artificial structures, switching to a new roost every other day on average. Roost trees tend to be close together, and within about 600 m (2,000 ft) of areas suitable for foraging. Males and non-reproductive females roost singly or in small groups, but reproductive females and their young form much larger maternity colonies, with up to sixty individuals.

In the fall, northern long-eared bats migrate to caves to hibernate. Depending on the latitude, this may occur at any time between September and November, and the bats emerge between March and May. They typically hibernate together with much larger numbers of bats of other species, although hibernating groups of northern long-eared bats may still number in the hundreds.

Northern long-eared bats are well-suited to foraging in the forest interior. Their echolocation calls have a classic frequency-modulated structure that allows these bats to navigate through cluttered environments, although they are shorter, quieter, and higher pitch (126 to 60 kHz) than those of other Myotis bats. Their diets are focused on moths, although they also eat beetles, flies, and other insects. Unusually, they capture these by gleaning, or plucking, the insects from a surface, rather than capturing them in flight. They forage under the forest canopy or in spaces at the edge of forests, and most foraging occurs in the first two hours after sunset. Northern long-eared bats are prone to a loss of foraging habitat diversity with the increase of urbanization. Foraging activity and species richness of these bats expands with enlarged areas made up of forests and native plant communities. Depending on the season and amount of rainfall, energetic costs of foraging rise, as the bats normally forage in areas a short distance away from their home. Due to their nature to cluster in groups and condense their foraging activity, maternity colonies are easy for researchers to monitor.

Mating occurs between July and early October, although the females probably store the sperm over the winter, and only become pregnant in the spring. The young are born between May and early July, depending on latitude, and are typically fully grown by the end of August. They have been recorded to live for over eighteen years in the wild.

== Conservation ==
The northern long-eared bat is predominantly threatened by white-nose syndrome, especially in the northeast portion of its range where the population has decreased by 99%. Due to white-nose syndrome the northern long-eared bat was listed federally threatened by the United States Fish and Wildlife Service (USFWS) under section 4(d) of the Endangered Species Act. An oversight field hearing was held before the United States House Committee on Natural Resources in September 2014. A final decision was published in the Federal Register, listing the species as threatened effective 30 days from the date of the publication (starting May 4, 2015). NatureServe considers the bat to be Imperiled. On November 29, 2022, the species was listed as endangered by the U.S. Fish and Wildlife Service via a statement from director Martha Williams, which took effect on March 31, 2023. On May 11, 2023, the United States Senate voted to disapprove of the reclassification. If the House of Representatives acts and the President signs, the action will be rescinded and the species would no longer be considered endangered federally.

The Elroy-Sparta Bike Trail tunnels in West Central Wisconsin are closed for the season by the beginning of November, using the doors that the railroad added to prevent storm damage. The debate on when to close the tunnel caused a conflict between the USFWS and the organizers of the Rails to Trails Marathon. The northern long-eared bat hibernates in Tunnel Number three. The Rails to Trails Marathon, a Boston Marathon qualifier, moved their event date to earlier in October from November in 2017 to accommodate an earlier tunnel closing than the original November 15 date.

One conservation solution that researchers have developed is artificial roost boxes, which combat many of the issues natural roosts subject the Myotis septentrionalis to. Natural roots expose the bats to predators, parasites, and uncontrollable temperatures, while often forcing the bats to venture far for food and water. Roost boxes, however, are able to prevent predation and parasitic creatures, have controllable temperature properties, and be placed wherever box managers choose.
