= Asterric acid =

Names
- Preferred IUPAC name 2-Hydroxy-6-[4-hydroxy-2-methoxy-6-(methoxycarbonyl)phenoxy]-4-methylbenzoic acid

Identifiers
CAS Number	577-64-0
3D model (JSmol)	Interactive image
ChemSpider	2338324
EC Number	804-200-6
PubChem CID	3080568
UNII	J3Q23XL4KN
CompTox Dashboard (EPA)	DTXSID60206405
- InChI: InChI=1S/C17H16O8/c1-8-4-11(19)14(16(20)21)12(5-8)25-15-10(17(22)24-3)6-9(18)7-13(15)23-2/h4-7,18-19H,1-3H3,(H,20,21) Key: XOKVHFNTYHPEHN-UHFFFAOYSA-N; InChI=1/C17H16O8/c1-8-4-11(19)14(16(20)21)12(5-8)25-15-10(17(22)24-3)6-9(18)7-13(15)23-2/h4-7,18-19H,1-3H3,(H,20,21) Key: XOKVHFNTYHPEHN-UHFFFAOYAF
- SMILES: CC1=CC(=C(C(=C1)OC2=C(C=C(C=C2C(=O)OC)O)OC)C(=O)O)O

Properties
Chemical formula	C_{17}H_{16}O_{8}
Molar mass	348.307 g·mol^{−1}

Hazards
- GHS labelling
Pictograms	(GHS09: Environmental hazard)
Signal word	Warning
Hazard statements	H410
Precautionary statements	P273, P391, P501
- Except where otherwise noted, data are given for materials in their standard state (at 25 °C [77 °F], 100 kPa). Infobox references

Asterric acid is a fungal metabolite that can inhibit endothelin binding, first isolated from Aspergillus terreus. Its derivatives and similar phenolic fungal isolates are a subject of research on anti-angiogenic compounds.
