= White-nose syndrome =

Fungal disease of bats

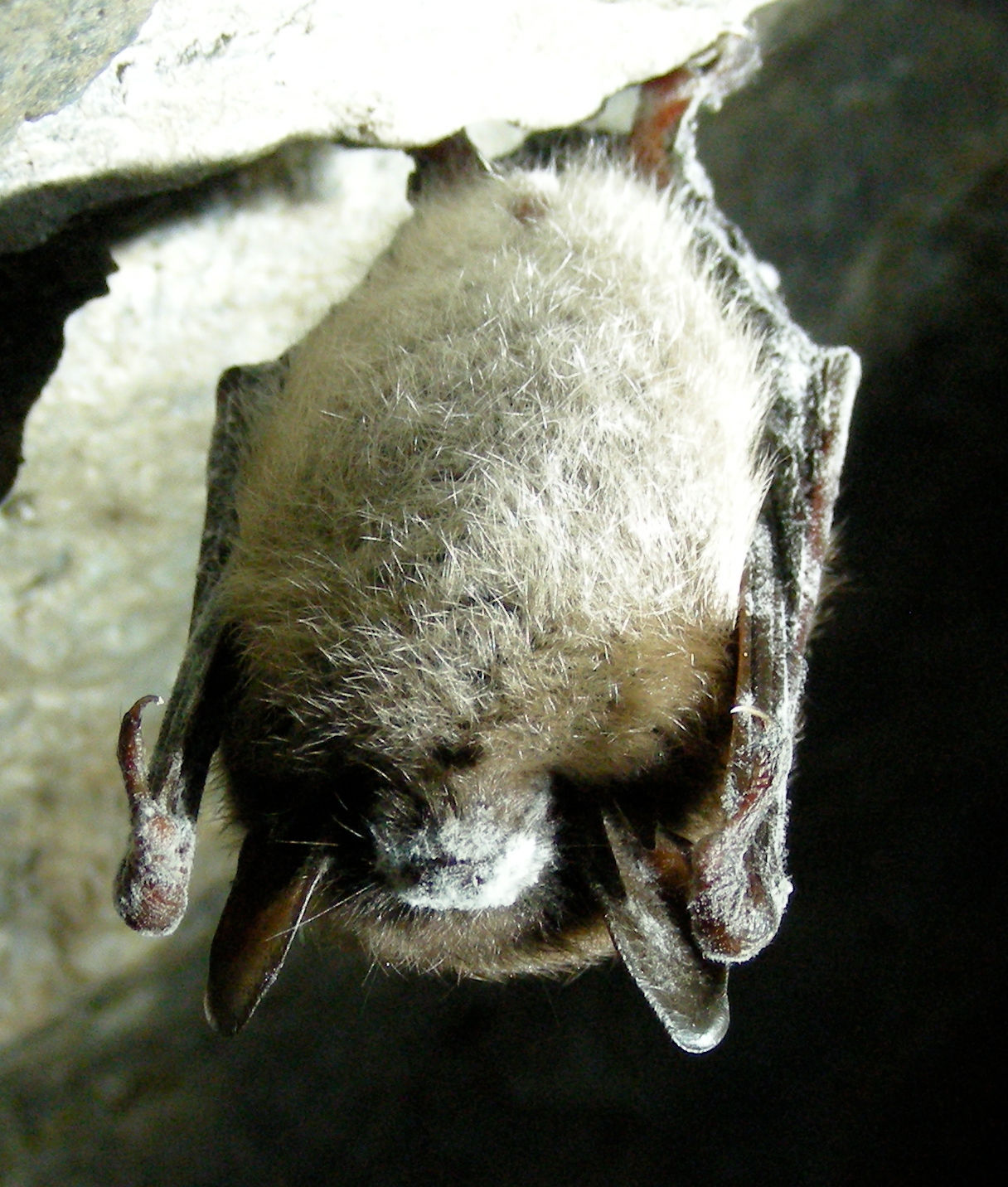
A little brown bat with white-nose syndrome.

White-nose syndrome (WNS) is a fungal disease in North American bats which has resulted in the dramatic decrease of the bat population in the United States and Canada, reportedly killing millions as of 2018. The condition is named for a distinctive fungal growth around the muzzles and on the wings of hibernating bats. It was first identified from a February 2006 photo taken in a cave located in Schoharie County, New York. The syndrome has rapidly spread since then. In early 2018, it was identified in 33 U.S. states and seven Canadian provinces; plus the fungus, albeit sans syndrome, had been found in three additional states. Most cases are in the eastern half of both countries, but in March 2016, it was confirmed in a little brown bat in Washington state. In 2019, evidence of the fungus was detected in California for the first time, although no affected bats were found.

The disease is caused by the fungus Pseudogymnoascus destructans, which colonizes the bat's skin. No obvious treatment or means of preventing transmission is known, and some species have declined by more than 90% within five years of the disease reaching a site.

The US Fish and Wildlife Service (USFWS) has called for a moratorium on caving activities in affected areas and strongly recommends to decontaminate clothing or equipment in such areas after each use. The National Speleological Society maintains an up-to-date page to keep cavers apprised of current events and advisories.

== Impact ==
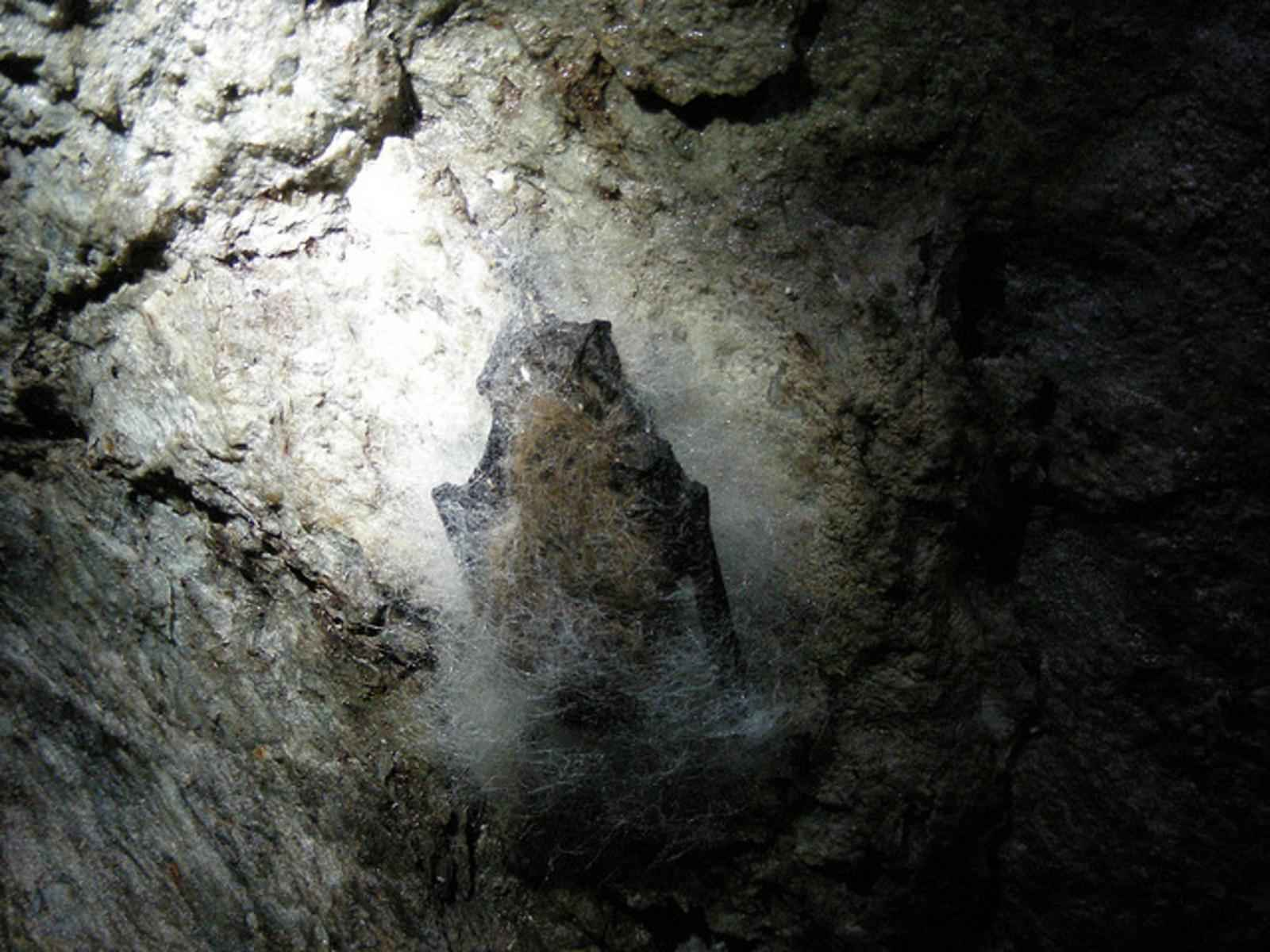
Little brown bat (Myotis lucifugus) affected by white-nose syndrome

As of 2012 white-nose syndrome was estimated to have caused 5.7 million to 6.7 million bat deaths in North America. In 2008 bats declined in some caves by more than 90%. Alan Hicks with the New York State Department of Environmental Conservation described the impact in 2008 as "unprecedented" and "the gravest threat to bats...ever seen." In 2016, it was reported that bat populations in the caves and mines of Georgia had been decimated in a similar fashion, after the fungus was first detected in there in 2013.

As of 2021, twelve North American bat species, including two endangered species and one threatened species have been affected by WNS or exposed to the causative fungus, Pseudogymnoascus destructans, with impacts varying widely. As of 2012 four species have suffered substantial declines and extinction of at least one species was predicted. Declines included species already listed as endangered in the US, such as the Indiana bat, whose hibernacula, in many states, have been affected. The once-common little brown bat has suffered a major population collapse in the northeastern US, although some individuals may be genetically resilient to the disease. In 2012 the northern long-eared myotis (Myotis septentrionalis) was reported to be extirpated from all sites where the disease has been present for more than four years. In 2009, the Virginia big-eared bat (Corynorhinus townsendii virginianus), the official state bat of Virginia, and the gray bat had yet to suffer measurable declines.

Beyond the direct effect on bat populations, WNS has broader ecological implications. The Forest Service estimated in 2008 that the die-off from white-nose syndrome means that at least 2.4 million pounds (1.1 million kg or 1100 tons) of insects will go uneaten and become a financial burden to farmers, possibly leading to crop damage or having other economic impact in New England. It is estimated that bats save farmers in the U.S. 3 billion dollars annually in pest control services. In addition, numerous bat species provide crucial pollination and seed dispersal services.

In 2008, comparisons were raised to colony collapse disorder, another poorly understood phenomenon resulting in the abrupt disappearance of western honey bee colonies, and with chytridiomycosis, a fungal skin disease linked with worldwide declines in amphibian populations.

Confirmed North American bat species identified with diagnostic symptoms of white-nose syndrome:
Image	Scientific name	Common name	Range	Conservation Status
	Eptesicus fuscus	Big brown bat		Least Concern
	Myotis evotis	Long-eared myotis		Least Concern
	Myotis grisescens	Gray bat		Vulnerable
	Myotis leibii	Eastern small-footed bat		Endangered
	Myotis lucifugus	Little brown bat		Endangered
	Myotis septentrionalis	Northern myotis		Near threatened
	Myotis sodalis	Indiana bat		Near threatened
	Myotis thysanodes	Fringed myotis		Least Concern
	Myotis velifer	Cave myotis		Least Concern
	Myotis volans	Long-legged myotis		Least Concern
	Myotis yumanensis	Yuma bat		Least Concern
	Perimyotis subflavus	Tricolored bat		Vulnerable

== Research ==
2009 VOA report about the disease

Biologists of the US Fish and Wildlife Service have been collecting information at each site in regard to the number of bats affected, the geographic extent of the outbreaks and samples of affected bats. They developed a geographic database to track the location of sites, where WNS has been found. The Fish and Wildlife Service has been partnering with the Northeastern Cave Conservancy to track movements of cavers that have visited affected sites in New York.

In 2009, the Service advised closing caves to explorers in 20 states, from the Midwest to New England. This directive was supposed to be extended to 13 southern states. One Virginia scientist stated, "If it gets into caves more to our south, in places like Tennessee, Kentucky, Georgia and Alabama, we're going to be talking deaths in the millions." In March 2012, WNS was discovered on some tri-colored bats (Perimyotis subflavus) in Russell Cave in Jackson County, Alabama.

=== Cause ===
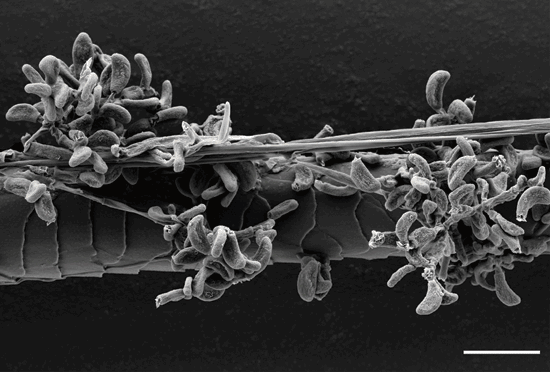
Pseudogymnoascus destructans

The fungus Pseudogymnoascus destructans is the primary cause of WNS. It preferably grows in the 4–15 °C range (39–59 °F) and will not grow at temperatures above 20 °C (68 °F). It is cold loving or psychrophilic. It is phylogenetically related to Geomyces spp., but with a conidial morphology distinct from characterized members of this genus. Early laboratory research placed the fungus in the genus Geomyces, but later phylogenic evaluation revealed this organism should be reclassified within Pseudogymnoascus.

A 2011 study found that 100% of healthy North American bats infected with the fungus cultured from infected bats exhibit lesions consistent with the disease. Direct microscopy and culture analyses demonstrated that the skin of the WNS-affected bats is colonized by the fungus.

The species has been found on bats in Europe and Asia, however, no unusual mortality could be assigned to the infections. Genetic studies have shown that the fungus must have been in Europe for a long time and was most likely transported to North America as a novel pathogen.

=== Infection ===
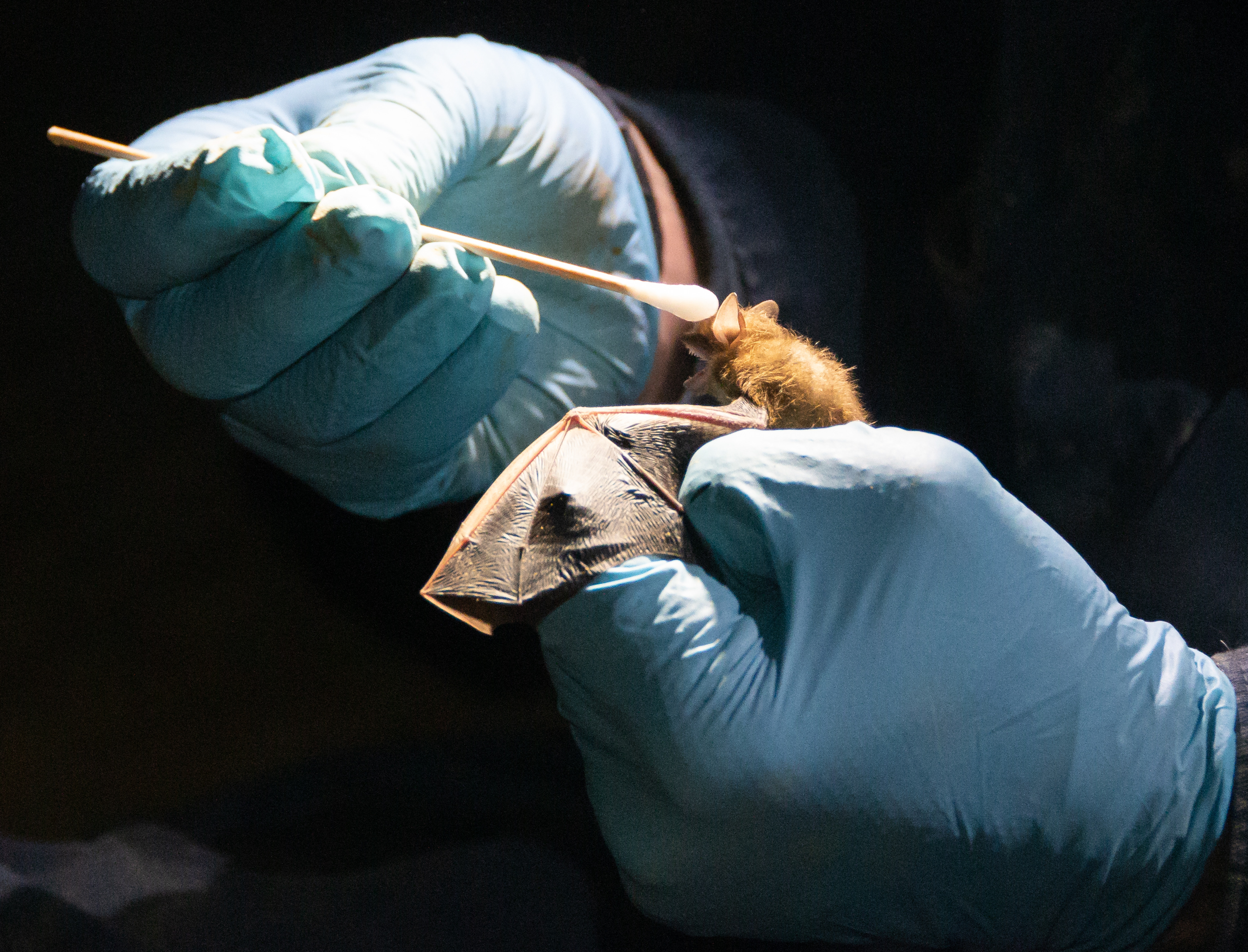
A scientist swabs the muzzle of a tricolored bat in Tennessee, to contribute to a study by Virginia Tech concerning the species and white-nose syndrome.

A laboratory experiment suggests that physical contact is required for one bat to infect another, because bats in mesh cages adjacent to infected bats did not contract the fungus. This implies that the fungus is not airborne, or at least, is not transmitted from bat to bat through the air. The primary way this fungus is spread is through bat-to-bat contact or infected cave-to-bat contact. The role of humans in the spread of the disease is debated. It is likely the fungus was brought to North America by human activities, because no bats normally migrate between Europe and North America, and the fungus was first discovered in New York where there are major trans-Atlantic air and shipping terminals. Geographical translocation of bats by ship and airplane have been documented. Research has shown the fungus can persist on human clothing and thus could be carried between locations by people, but as of 2016 it has not been demonstrated that this has played any role in the spread of the disease.

==== Signs of disease ====
The visually most obvious indication of infection is the presence of white fungal growth on the muzzles and wing membranes of affected bats. However, P. destructans may also be present in lower concentrations without leading to obvious visible cues, persisting as a cryptic infection; this appears to be more likely in some species than in others (e.g., the gray bat).

As early as 2011 it was hypothesized that prematurely expending the fat reserves for winter survival may be a cause for death. A 2014 study found that while bats can successfully fight off the fungus between mid-October and May, their resistance falls to near zero once they begin to hibernate when the animals shut their metabolism down to save energy. The signs observed with WNS include unusual winter behavior like abnormally frequent or abnormally long arousal from the state of torpor. Each time they rouse, they start using more energy and if this happens too much, they can use up their fat stores and starve. Some bats will even leave their winter shelters in search of absent insects and risk dying of exposure in the cold. Consequently many infected bats don't make it until spring when their immune systems and body temperatures ramp up and insect food sources again emerge.

==== Pathophysiology ====
Until December 2014 the cause for the abnormal behavior was unclear, as no physiological data linking altered behavior to hypothesized increased energy demands existed.

The Fish and Wildlife Service published a case control study in December 2014: Of 60 little brown bats, 39 bats were randomly assigned to infection by applying conidia to skin of the dorsal surface of both wings and 21 bats remained controls. All were observed for 95 days and euthanized. 32 bats developed WNS (30 mild to moderate and 2 moderate to severe). The remaining seven infected bats were PCR-positive with normal wing histology. Infected bats with WNS had higher proportions of lean tissue mass to fat tissue mass than uninfected bats in measuring an increase in total body water volume as a percent of body mass. Infected bats used twice as much energy as healthy bats, and starved to death. Direct calculations of energy expenditure failed for most bats, because isotope concentrations were indistinguishable from background. There was also no difference in torpor durations in this experiment; the average torpor duration for infected bats was 9.1 days with an average arousal of 54 min. Average torpor duration for control bats was 8.5 days with an average arousal duration of 55 min. Infected bats suffered respiratory acidosis with an almost 40% higher mean pCO_{2} than healthy bats, and potassium concentration was significantly higher. Hence the following model of infection exists: Pseudogymnoascus destructans colonizes and eventually invades the wing epidermis. This causes increased energy expenditure, and an elevated blood pCO_{2} and bicarbonate called chronic respiratory acidosis, possibly due to diffusion problems. Hyperkalemia (elevated blood potassium) ensues because of an acidosis-induced extracellular shift of potassium. Dying, infected cells could also leak their (intracellular) potassium into the blood. The damaged wing epidermis might stimulate increased frequencies of arousal from torpor, which removes excess CO_{2} and normalizes blood pH, at the expense of hydration and fat reserves. With worsening wing damage, the effects are exacerbated by water and electrolyte loss across the wound (hypotonic dehydration), which stimulates more frequent arousals in a positive feedback loop that ultimately leads to death.

=== Geographical spread ===
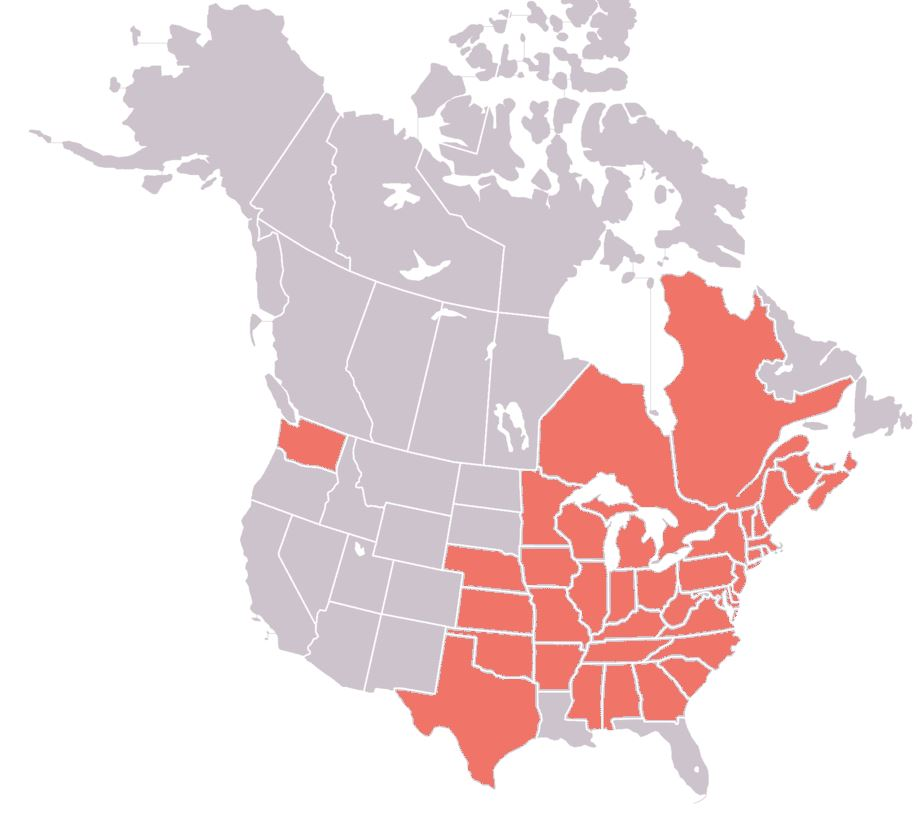
States and provinces affected by white-nose syndrome as of April 2018

The disease was first reported in January 2007 in New York caves, although it was retrospectively detected in a photograph taken in early 2006. It spread to other New York caves and into Vermont, Massachusetts, and Connecticut by 2008. In early 2009, it was confirmed in New Hampshire, New Jersey, Pennsylvania, Virginia, West Virginia and in March 2010, in Ontario Canada, Maryland, Middle Tennessee, Missouri, and Quebec, Canada. In 2011, the syndrome was confirmed in Ohio, Indiana, Kentucky, North Carolina, Maine, New Brunswick and Nova Scotia. In the winter of 2011–2012, Alabama, Delaware and Arkansas confirmed the disease in bats and new cases showed up in northeastern Ohio, and Acadia National Park in Maine. Confirmed cases appeared in 2013 in Georgia, South Carolina, Illinois, and the Canadian province of Prince Edward Island. In March, 2014, WDNR and USGS staff conducting routine surveillance detected white-nose syndrome in a single mine in Grant County Wisconsin and the USGS National Wildlife Health Center later confirmed the disease. In April, 2014, the Michigan Department of Natural Resources announced that the disease had been found in Alpena County, Mackinac County, and Dickinson County. In May, 2014, after retesting, the Myotis velifer specimen from Oklahoma and other swabs and samples from the area tested negative, and Oklahoma and Myotis velifer were removed from the list of WNS suspects.

As of April 2014, the syndrome had been confirmed in 25 states and 5 Canadian provinces. The causative fungus has been confirmed in three additional states: Iowa, Minnesota, and Mississippi.

A little brown bat (Myotis lucifugus) was found in Washington state infected with white-nose syndrome in March 2016. Researchers suspect through DNA analysis that the source of infection in this individual originated in the Eastern U.S. This has been the westernmost case discovered in North America thus far. A second case of white-nose syndrome was detected in Washington in April 2017. The infected bat was a Yuma myotis (Myotis yumanensis), which was the first time the disease has been found in this species.

In March 2017, the fungus was found on bats in six north Texas counties, bringing the number of states with the fungus to 33. Three bat species tested positive.

In April 2018, it was announced that bats in Kansas were documented with white-nose syndrome, making it the first time infected bats were found in Kansas.

In May 2018, it was announced that bats in Manitoba were found to be infected with white-nose syndrome.

In May 2019, the fungus was found in the home of the largest colony of bats in the world, Bracken Cave, near San Antonio, Texas.

While field surveys conducted in 2020 have confirmed the presence of the fungus throughout multiple counties in Montana, the first death of an infected bat was confirmed in April 2021.

In early 2023, the fungus had been detected in bat guano near the city of Grand Forks in British Columbia.

=== Decontamination ===
The fungus Pseudogymnoascus destructans, or a closely related species of fungus, has been found in soil samples from infected caves and suggests that it can be transported from cave to cave by soil, such as that carried by human clothing. Precautionary decontamination methods are being encouraged to inhibit the possible spread of spores by humans. The WNS Decontamination Team, a sub-group of the Disease Management Working Group, published a national decontamination protocol on March 15, 2012. They revised the protocol on June 25, 2012. In March 2024, the White-Nose Syndrome Disease Management Working Group issued a revised National White-Nose Syndrome Decontamination Protocol to reduce human-assisted spread of the fungus. The protocol identifies dedicating equipment to a single site, and hot-water submersion, as its preferred approaches, and advises against moving gear from a positive site to one where the fungus is absent or its status is unknown. Approved treatments include submerging suitable gear in hot water of at least 55 °C (131 °F) for five continuous minutes, as well as surface treatment with chemical disinfectants such as 50–70% isopropanol, bleach solutions, or hydrogen peroxide products.

As of 2008, cave management and preservation organizations had begun requesting that cave visitors limit their activities and disinfect clothing and equipment that has been used in possibly infected caves. The current protocol goes further, and indicates that in many cases it is inappropriate to reuse even disinfected gear, and that new gear should be used.

In some cases, access to caves is being closed entirely. According to New York State Department of Environmental Conservation Commissioner Basil Seggos, "Research ... demonstrates that white-nose syndrome makes bats highly susceptible to disturbances. Even a single, seemingly quiet visit can kill bats that would otherwise survive the winter. If you see hibernating bats, assume you are doing harm and leave immediately." When hibernating bats are disturbed, it raises their body temperatures, depleting fat reserves.

=== Treatments ===
A 2019 study found that bats treated with Pseudomonas fluorescens, a probiotic bacterium previously used in chytridiomycosis treatments, were five times more likely to survive post-hibernation.

== See also ==
- Anthropocene
- Chytridiomycosis
- Decline in amphibian populations
- Holocene extinction
