= Cephalotheca foveolata =

Scientific classification
- Kingdom: Fungi
- Division: Ascomycota
- Class: Sordariomycetes
- Order: Cephalothecales
- Family: Cephalothecaceae
- Genus: Cephalotheca
- Species: C. foveata

Binomial name
- Cephalotheca foveata Yaguchi, Nishimura & Udagawa (2006)

Synonyms
- Cephalotheca faveolata Giridharan, Verekar, Khanna, Mishra, Deshmukh (2012)

Species of fungus

Cephalotheca foveolata is a species of fungus. It is rarely opportunistic and generally manifests as a minor subcutaneous infection.

== History and taxonomy ==
Cephalotheca foveolata was first discovered in 2006 in a subcutaneous infection of the foot in South Korea. The fungus was said to be "foveolate" because of its small pitted ascospores. The fungus has also been called Cephalotheca faveolata by Giridharan, Verekar, Khanna, Mishra, Deshmukh in 2012. C. foveolata is morphologically and molecularly very similar to other pathogenic species of fungus, especially those within the genera of Phialemonium and Acremonium. The D1/D2 variable domains of 28S rDNA have often been used to identify C. foveolata. This is necessary to distinguish C. foveolata from Cephalotheca sulfurea which has 95% homology or Phialemonium obovatum, another closely related species.

== Habitat and ecology ==
C. foveolata has been discovered rarely but in areas around the world that differ greatly from each other. Most cases have been reported in the southern United States or southeast Asia (South Korea, Singapore, and Hong Kong). As a saprophyte, C. foveolata generally makes its home in the soil, but can also be found growing on wood or mushrooms. An exact niche for this fungus has yet to be detailed.

== Growth and morphology ==
C. foveolata displays both teleomorph and anamorph stages in vitro as well as in its natural habitat, it is one of very few Ascomycetes that is able to do so. It also produces thick walled chlamydospores with a 3-6 μm diameter.

In vitro the C. foveolata is black, brown, white, orange even yellowish sometimes. The colonies reach a 45–50 mm diameter in vitro on OA or PDA media in 14 days at 25 °C. Its maximum growth temperature is 39 °C though 25 °C is optimal. When grown on PFA medium C. foveolata produces a reddish brown diffusing pigment.

Conidiogenesis occurs in vitro. These conidiogenous cells remain undifferentiated from hyphae and are monophialidic with ellipsoidal conidia at the end of short conidiophores. The conidia are translucent, cylindrical, 4-5x1.5-2 μm, and are said to be very similar to the conidia of Phialemonium. The cleistothecia fruiting bodies are dark and ciliated with a peridium made of elongated, thick walled cells.

The pitted ascospores for which C. foveolata gets its name are generally kidney shaped, 4-5x3-4x2.5-3 μm, and hyaline to brown. The sexual spores are found in translucent brown 8 celled asci.

== Mechanism of pathology ==
C. foveolata has been described as an opportunistic human pathogen and it is potentially consumed as a contaminant on food. After the first reported case in South Korea there have been 6 other cases as of 2011. Cases have included subcutaneous infections, infections of eyes, nails, lymph nodes, cardiac tissue, bronchial fluid, and one case of bloodstream infection. Symptoms were minor for all cases except in the case of the bloodstream infection where the patient had fevers, upper back pain and shortness of breath. Patients with subcutaneous infections had chronic granulomatous inflammation around infection; otherwise, urinalysis, liver/renal function tests, stool examinations, blood counts and smears all return results within normal limits.

== Treatment ==
When C. foveolata was first discovered in South Korea a surgical removal was performed. The patient was followed for a year afterwards and it seemed the surgery was successful. Since then many anti-fungal drugs have been tried against C. foveolata. The most effective drugs so far have been amphotericin B, posaconazole and voriconazole. They inhibit all growth after 48 hours at 35 °C. Caspofungin causes abnormal growth after 24 hours and is not considered effective. Itraconazole is reported with conflicting levels of effectiveness. C. foveolata seems to be resistant to AMB, itraconazole, and terbinafine.

== Medicinal uses ==
C. foveolata produces a metabolite called sclerotiorin. Sclerotiorin has been shown to induce apoptosis in colon cancer cells by activating a pathway leading to caspase-3 activation.
