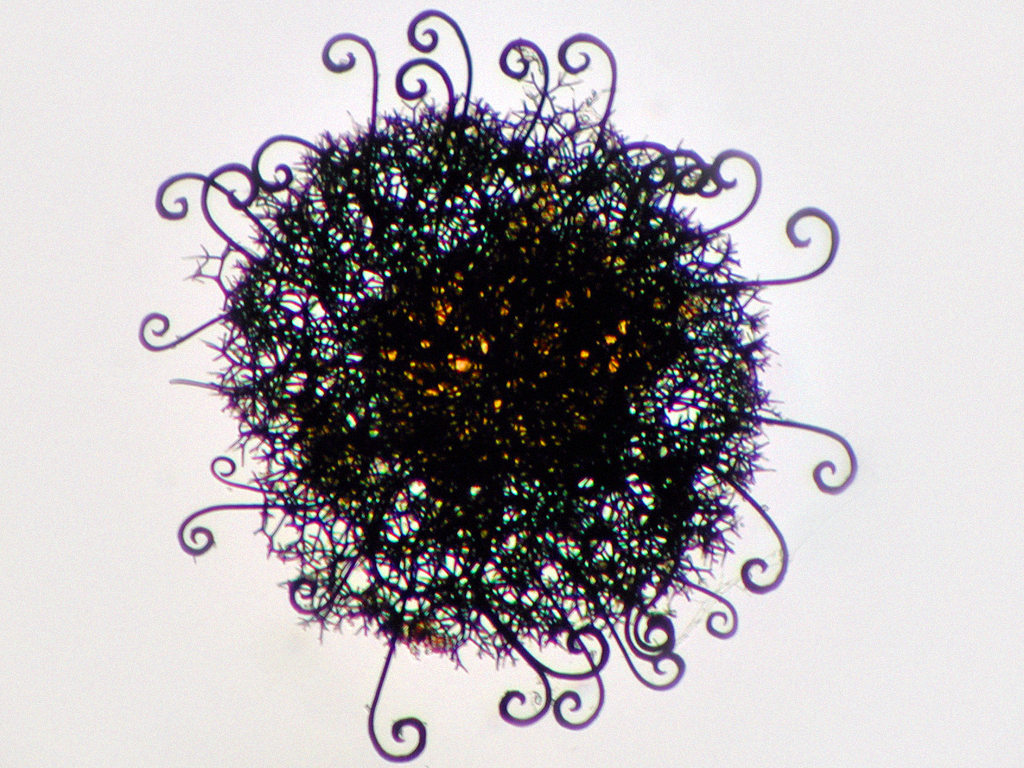

Scientific classification
- Kingdom: Fungi
- Division: Ascomycota
- Class: Leotiomycetes
- Order: Helotiales
- Family: Myxotrichaceae
- Genus: Myxotrichum
- Species: M. chartarum

Binomial name
- Myxotrichum chartarum Kunze (1823)

Synonyms
- Oncidium chartarum (Kunze) Nees (1823); Actinospira chartarum (Kunze) Corda (1854); Myxotrichum carminoparum Robak (1932)

= Myxotrichum chartarum =

Species of fungus

Myxotrichum chartarum is a psychrophilic and cellulolytic fungus first discovered in Germany by Gustav Kunze in 1823. Its classification has changed many times over its history to better reflect the information available at the time. Currently, M. chartarum is known to be an ascomycete surrounded by a gymnothecium composed of ornate spines and releases asexual ascospores. The presence of cellulolytic processes are common in fungi within the family Myxotrichaceae. M. chartarum is one of many Myxotrichum species known to degrade paper and paper products. Evidence of M. chartarum "red spot" mold formation, especially on old books, can be found globally. As a result, this fungal species and other cellulolytic molds are endangering old works of art and books. Currently, there is no evidence that suggests that species within the family Myxotrichaceae are pathogenic.

== History and taxonomy ==
Myxotrichum chartarum was discovered by Gustav Kunze in 1823, along with another species in the new genus Myxotrichum, Myxotrichum murorum.

There has been much confusion within the genus Myxotrichum due to numerous revisions in classification over the years and the scarcity of isolations. Eventually, the genus, Myxotrichum became associated with ascomycota fungi which are dematiaceous hyphomycetes, commonly known as black yeasts or moulds. At the microscopic level, these fungi have a mesh-like surrounding structures, peridium, with hooked appendages.

It was mistakenly placed in the genus Oncidium by Nees, also in 1823, though that name which was already in use for a genus of orchid, giving Myxotrichum priority. In 1838, August Carl Joseph Corda classified M. chartarum as a hyphomycete in the family Sporotrichacheae, as species belonging to this family had ornate appendages resembling deer antlers. In 1854, Corda separated M. chartarum from Myxotrichum into the newly established genus, Actinospira because he believed it to produce conidia rather than ascospores. In 1959, Kuehn, among other investigators, reviewed the status of the family Gymnoascaceae and placed M. chartarum into the ascomycetous genus, Myxotrichum rather than the newly established genus for conidial forms, Myxotrichella.

In 1875, Fuckel declared M. chartarum to be the conidial form of Chaetomium kunzeanum. Fries thought M. chartarum was a conidial form of Chaetomium chartarum. His opinion was supported by Boulanger in 1897. Their revelation was founded because of the high resemblance between Chaetomium and Myxotrichum fungal families due to the presence of ornamental hairs. In 1889, Richon thought M. chartarum was the conidial form of Cephalotheca sulfurea, disputing the claim of Fuckel. In 1891, Constantin showed that M. chartarum belonged to the newly established family, ascomycete of the family Gymnoascaceae, for ascomycetes that lacked true cleistothecia or perithecia. In 1892, Rabenhorst classified M. chartarum into the order Gymnoascaceae. This was later supported by Schroter in 1893. Fischer later recognized the existence of ascospores in M. chartarum, but a distinct lack of conidial structures. In 1893, Schroeter reviewed family Gymnoascaceae and placed species with uncinate appendages within the genus, Myxotrichum without regard for other characteristics.

Different forms of M. chartarum were isolated by Robak and Udagawa that resembled a phenotypically similar species. The isolate discovered by Robak (1932) of M. carminoparum resembled M. chartarum in every way except in the characteristically flattened apical area. Another isolate was discovered by Udagawa (1963) to have flattened appendages, but the size of the ascomata was smaller, resembling those from M. carminoparum. Later, the species, M. chartarum and M. carminoparum were merged due to the high resemblance between the two species.

== Growth and morphology ==
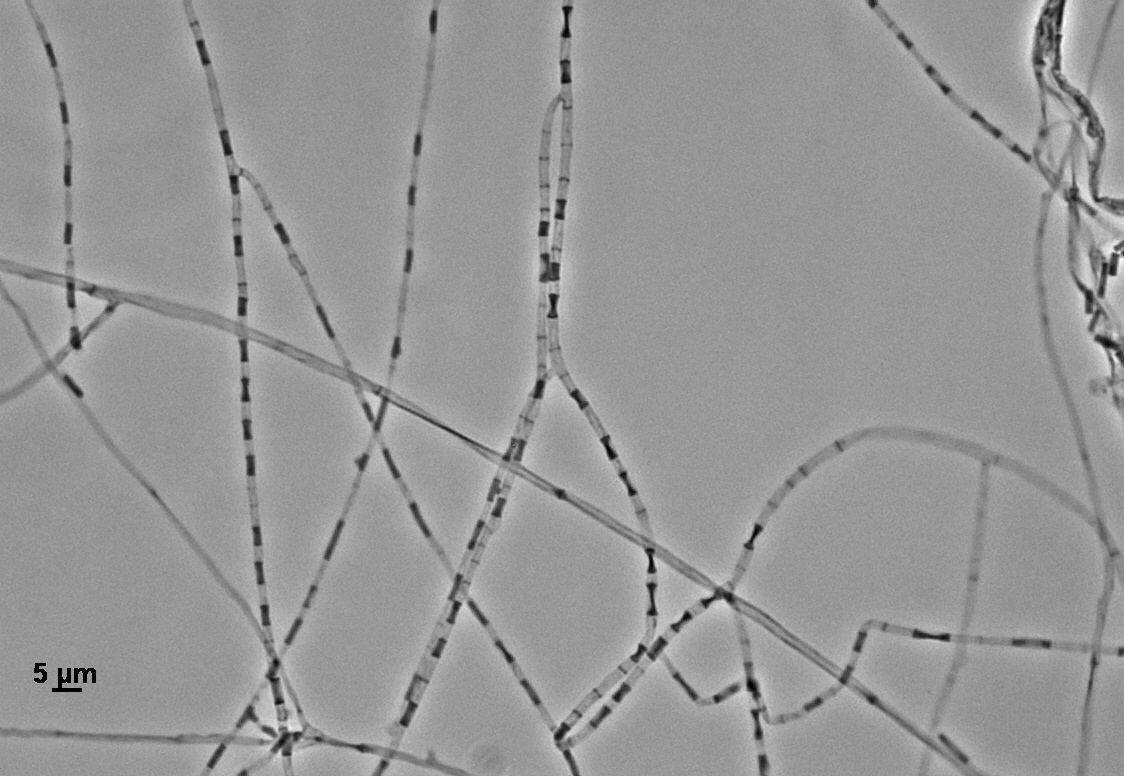
Intercalary arthroconidia of Myxotrichum chartarum (UAMH 10244) from colony grown for 36d, photographed in Phase Contrast microscopy.

=== Growth in its natural environment ===
The ascospores can also be described as being yellow to orange in colour with a rounded football shape having longitudinal striations and a diameter between 6-8 μm on the long side and 5-8 μm on the short side. Asci appear hyaline, globular, and contain the typical quantity of 8 ascospores each, the size of which are 3-5 μm on the long side and 2-3 μm on the short side. When the spores mature, they are released en masse, producing a cloud of brown-coloured dust. Ascocarps appear dark and spherical with short appendages, and when filled with its yellow to orange spores, the ascocarp can appear green or copper. The diameter of the ascocarp is 150-555 μm. The spore mass fills the ascocarps between one-third and three-fourths of the total volume at peak maturity. The surrounding Gymnothecium has septate appendages that are straight and elongated. Branching points present as uncinate, or curved spines that are wider or flattened at the apices. Commonly found in Myxotrichum species are the secondary and tertiary branching of peridial hyphae. These branches can be identified by the lighter colouring in comparison to the ascocarp of the fungi, or truncation that results from the fragility of such branching. These truncations were previously thought to have been the release of conidiophores, but no evidence was found on initial conidiophore attachment.

=== Life cycle ===
There are few records of the asexual or anamorphic stage within the family Gymnascaceae. Descriptions made by Kuehn (1955) and Robak (1932) described oidia and chlamydospores, though rare in occurrence. However, Benjamin (1956) acknowledged that there were indeed arthrospores and aleuriospores present in Gymnascaceae. The anamorphs of M. chartarum may belong to the genera, Malbranchea and Oidiodendron.

=== Growth in laboratory culture ===
In culture and grown at 25 °C, M. chartarum appears yellow and fluffy. Some cultures had areas that were black in appearance, which were due to visible mature ascomata. However, growth was restricted at this temperature, as fungi in the family Myxotrichaceae have a preference for temperatures below 18 °C. At temperatures of 18 °C, the fungus grew at 2 cm a month. Optimal growing temperatures were described as being between +5 and +7 °C. Production of a red-brown pigment when grown on mycelia and on certain culture media, functions to detoxify the surrounding environment. This is due to a reaction produced by the laccases secreted in the presence of polyphenols. The presence of pigmentation occurs early on for polyphenol detection. However, this effect weakens when the fungus is exposed to higher levels of polyphenols, indicating metabolic function inhibition caused by the presence of these compounds.

== Habitat and ecology ==
M. chartarum is known for its inhabitation of paper and paper products. The specific epithet, chartarum, originated from the Latin word for paper and is in reference to its initial discovery from paper in books, and its ability to decay these materials through the production of cellulose-degrading enzymes (cellulases). It was deemed a “material pathogen”, since it is able to degrade specific materials for a source of nutrition. It has also been recorded to inhabit other materials such as, drywall, straw, decaying leather, cloth, grouse dung, rabbit dung, bat guano, soil, leaves and fruit. Reports of M. chartarum have come from around the world. Known distribution areas are as follows: Germany, Russia, Italy, France, Switzerland, England, Japan, Austria-Hungary, Czechoslovakia, Maine, Massachusetts, Ontario, New York. The endemic region of this fungus is currently unknown. The presence of curved spines allow the fungus to adhere to the fur of animals, allowing the fungus to disperse to other areas.

It has been observed by multiple researchers that M. chartarum exhibited slow growth between temperatures of 5-7 °C, so this fungus is classified as a psychrophilic organism. However, no growth was observed at 37 °C and since it is unable to grow at the human body temperature, this fungus is not a disease agent or an opportunistic pathogen. As found by Tribe and Weber (2002), optimal growth in culture can be achieved on mineral salt agar with a sheet of Cellophane as the only carbon source. In basements or cellars, M. chartarum has a preference for gypsum board ceilings and building paper on concrete surfaces on the cold side of foundation walls. For optimal growth, it requires a relative humidity of greater than 98%. Salinity and pH preferences are unknown, but it is thought to be halo-tolerant.
