= Oidiodendron cereale =

Scientific classification
- Kingdom: Fungi
- Division: Ascomycota
- Class: Leotiomycetes
- Order: Helotiales
- Family: Myxotrichaceae
- Genus: Oidiodendron
- Species: O. cereale

Binomial name
- Oidiodendron cereale G.L.Barron (1962)

Synonyms
- Sporotrichum cerealis Thümen (1880); Oidiodendron nigrum Robak (1932); Haplographium fuligineum J.F.H.van Beyma (1933); Stephanosporium atrum Giovanna Dal Vesco (1961); Stephanosporium cereale H.J.Swart (1965)

Species of ascomycetes fungi in the order Helotiales

Oidiodendron cereale is a species of ascomycetes fungi in the order Helotiales. This fungus is found globally in temperate climates where average summer temperatures are below 25 °C, but there have been scattered reports from tropical and subtropical environments. It is predominantly found in soil, but little is known regarding their ecological roles in nature. However, an enzymatic study from Agriculture Canada showed that O. cereale can break down a variety of plant, fungal, and animal based substrates found in soil, which may have beneficial effects for plants. On rare occasions, this fungus is found on human skin and hair. There has been one reported case of O. cereale infection in 1969, causing Neurodermitis Nuchae.

== History and taxonomy ==
The anamorphic fungus was first described in the Belgian journal Hedwigia by Dr. Von F. von Thümen as Sporotrichum cerealis in 1880. Then in 1932, a Swedish mycologist, Dr. H. Robak, identified Oidiodendron nigrum while investigating fungal infections at wood pulp mills. Further investigation of the genus Oidiodendron by Dr. G. L. Barron revealed that Sporotrichum cerealis and Oidiodendron nigrum were the same organism and thereafter, named the species Oidiodendron cereale. In 1998, Hambleton et al. using ribosomal DNA sequences confirmed that O. cereale is from the Oidiodendron genus and related to the other Oidiodendron species.

== Growth and morphology ==
=== Growth ===
This fungus grows hyphally and its asexual reproduction cycles have been well described in literature. Asexual reproduction occurs through its lens-shaped arthroconidia with thickened rings of cell wall material. Young colonies appear grey and turns purple-black as it matures. The conidiophores develop by dividing their branches into sections of equal length. Then it rounds off the branch and develops into the same number of spores. At maturity, the spores fall away from each other and the old wall remains attached to the adjacent conidia as a fringe. Conidia are dispersed by wind and arthropods, where the conidia adhere to the carrier's exoskeleton electrostatically. Conidiophores are produced in all species of Oidiodendron, but the production of conidiophores are not obligatory.

=== Morphology ===
Oidiodendron cereale colonies appear green-grey, but dark brown to black under areas of heavy sporulation. Due to its dark colony colour, it is generally classified as a dematiaceous fungus. Its hyphae are 1-2 μm broad, some branches at the foot (treelike), while others don't, and are irregularly curved. The conidia are dark grey, short-chained, clumped at conidiophore apex, has a ring, and spans 2.2-5.4 μm by 2.0-2.7 μm. The conidiophores are short, branched, and hyaline to lightly melanized. The hyaline conidiophores and lens-shaped arthroconidia with thickened rings of cell wall material make this species unique. Henceforth, the initial placement of this species was outside of the genus Oidiodendron. With molecular analysis, evidence supports its placement within Oidiodendron and its morphological distinction is significant only at the species levels.

== Physiology ==
Oidiodendron cereale is psychrotolerant and has an optimal temperature between 20-25°C. However, it also has the ability to grow at temperatures as low as 5°C. Decreased growth is observed when the temperature is below 5°C or above 25°C. Oidiodendron cereale is acidophilic with an optimal pH range of 3-5, and it does not grow in high salt conditions. Enzymatic studies have revealed that O. cereale has cellulolytic abilities. In addition, it has pectinases, gelatinases, lipases, and polyphenol oxidases that facilitate the degradation of a variety of plant, fungal, and animal substrates.

== Habitat and ecology ==
Oidiodendron cereale is found predominantly in soil, but it can also be found in wood and peat, and on human skin and hair. In addition, there has been an isolation of this fungus in human food supplies. Due to the physiology of this species, it prefers to live in temperate climates. However, there have been reports from tropical and subtropical locations of this fungus.

Although this fungus has been identified from a plethora of locations globally and different growing environments, little is understood about their ecological roles. An association study on the mycorrhizal status of this fungus has been inconclusive. Targeted isolation studies are required to determine the ecological role of O. cereale.

== Human disease ==
There has only been one published case of infection caused by O. cereale. In 1969, a female clerk at the Skin Department of the Helsinki University Central Hospital reported itchiness on her neck. Near the nape of the neck, there was an archetypal presentation of neurodermitis nuchae, or more commonly known as atopic dermatitis. A sample was cultured from her neck and on all three occasions, O. cereale was present. After further investigation, this fungus was found in the mycoflora of old Finnish wooden saunas, where the patient had previously visited.
