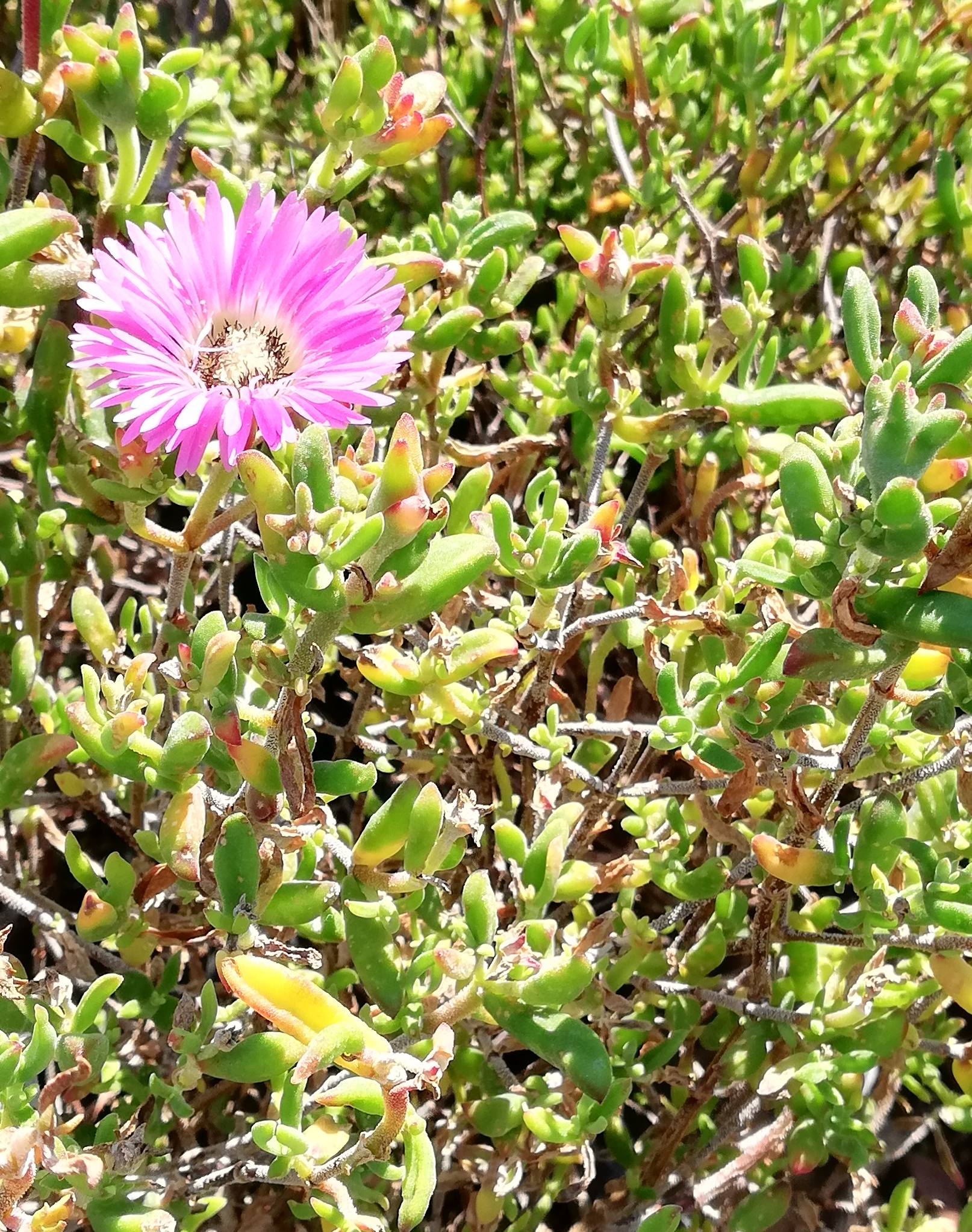

Scientific classification
- Kingdom: Plantae
- Clade: Tracheophytes
- Clade: Angiosperms
- Clade: Eudicots
- Order: Caryophyllales
- Family: Aizoaceae
- Genus: Drosanthemum
- Species: D. lavisii

Binomial name
- Drosanthemum lavisii L.Bolus

= Drosanthemum lavisii =

Species of succulent

Drosanthemum lavisii is a succulent plant in the ice plant family, Aizoaceae, indigenous to the Overberg region of the Western Cape Province, South Africa.

== Description ==
This species is a slender, succulent shrub. The leaves are small, slender (10–14 x 1–3mm), and often slightly wider than they are thick (i.e. slightly flattened). Each leaf has a pointed hook at its tip, that curves downwards. Like D. speciosum and D. pulchrum, it has smooth leaf-surfaces. The flowers can be bright yellow, orange, pink or red.

Drosanthemum lavisii can be distinguished by its recurved, hooked (uncinate) leaf-tips. This character, especially prominent in new leaves, and is also seen in D. edwardsiae and D. uniondalense.

It can also be distinguished by the rough base of its calyx, with 9 to 13 bladder cells along each ridge. This character is shared with D. boerhavii however.

=== Related species ===
Drosanthemum lavisii is part of a group of similar Drosanthemum species, in subgenus "Speciosa". These nine species all have black filamentous staminodes in the centre of their flowers, they are all small, erect shrubs, and they all occur in the southern Cape, South Africa.

Other species of Drosanthemum subgenus Speciosa include: Drosanthemum bellum, Drosanthemum boerhavii, Drosanthemum edwardsiae, Drosanthemum hallii, Drosanthemum micans, Drosanthemum pulchrum, Drosanthemum speciosum, and Drosanthemum uniondalense.

== Distribution ==
Drosanthemum lavisii is an endangered species, endemic to the Western Cape Province, South Africa.

Its distribution range extends from Ashton, Bonnievale and Montagu in the north, southwards as far as Bredasdorp and the northern foothills of the Potberg mountain. Eastwards, it occurs through the Heidelberg and Riversdale regions of the Overberg, as far as Albertinia.

Specifically, its distribution range follows the inland transition-zone, between the Renosterveld and Fynbos vegetation types.

== Habitat ==
The habitat preference of D.lavisii is for conglomerates and colluvial terraces, with cobbles of quartzite. Sometimes there are also elements of silcrete, ferricrete or shales (it is frequently found in Shale Renostervelds and Ferricrete Fynbos vegetation types).

The surrounding vegetation includes small shrubs, Restionaceae and a high density of grasses among the alluvial gravels.
