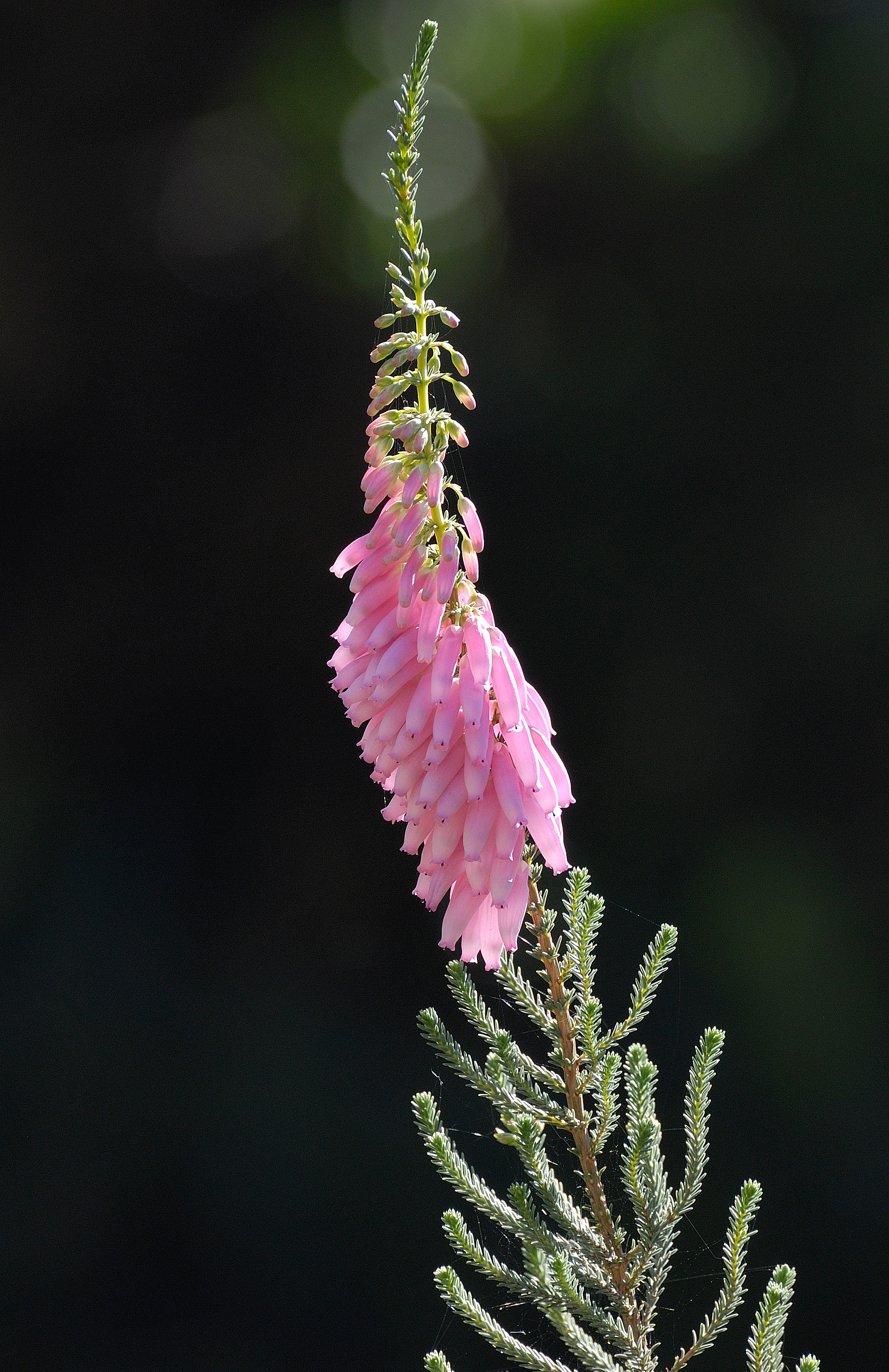

Scientific classification
- Kingdom: Plantae
- Clade: Tracheophytes
- Clade: Angiosperms
- Clade: Eudicots
- Clade: Asterids
- Order: Ericales
- Family: Ericaceae
- Genus: Erica
- Species: E. bauera

Binomial name
- Erica bauera Andrews

Synonyms
- Erica boweri Donovan; Ericoides bowieanum (Lodd.) Kuntze; Syringodea bowieana (G.Lodd.) G.Don

= Erica bauera =

Species of flowering plant

Erica bauera, the Albertinia white heath or bridal heath, is a plant that belongs to the genus Erica and forms part of the fynbos. The species is endemic to the Western Cape and occurs from Riversdale to Albertinia.

The flat is popular as a garden plant and is rare in its natural habitat. Its habitat has become drastically smaller, 90%, since 2012 due to invasive plants, overgrazing, agricultural activities and a lack of management of the field.
