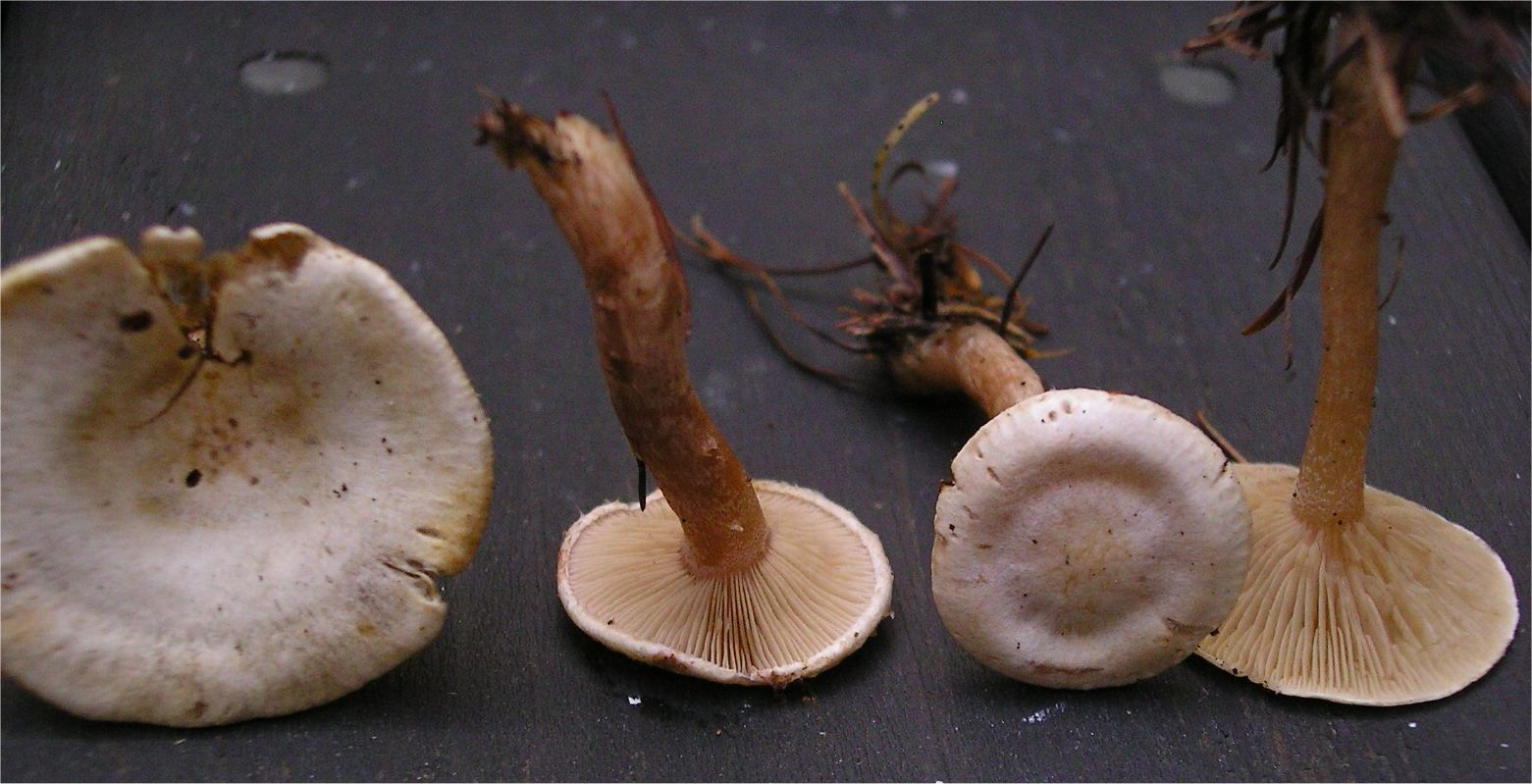
- Ripartites tricholoma

Scientific classification
- Kingdom: Fungi
- Division: Basidiomycota
- Class: Agaricomycetes
- Order: Agaricales
- Family: Tricholomataceae
- Genus: Ripartites
- Species: R. tricholoma

Binomial name
- Ripartites tricholoma (Alb. & Schwein.) P.Karst.

= Ripartites tricholoma =

Species of fungus

Ripartites tricholoma, commonly known as the bearded seamine, is a species of fungus in the family Tricholomataceae. It was first described scientifically as Agaricus tricholoma by Albertini and Lewis David von Schweinitz in 1805, and later transferred into the genus Ripartites by Petter Karsten in 1879. It is found in North America and Europe, and has also been collected in Costa Rica.

== Description ==
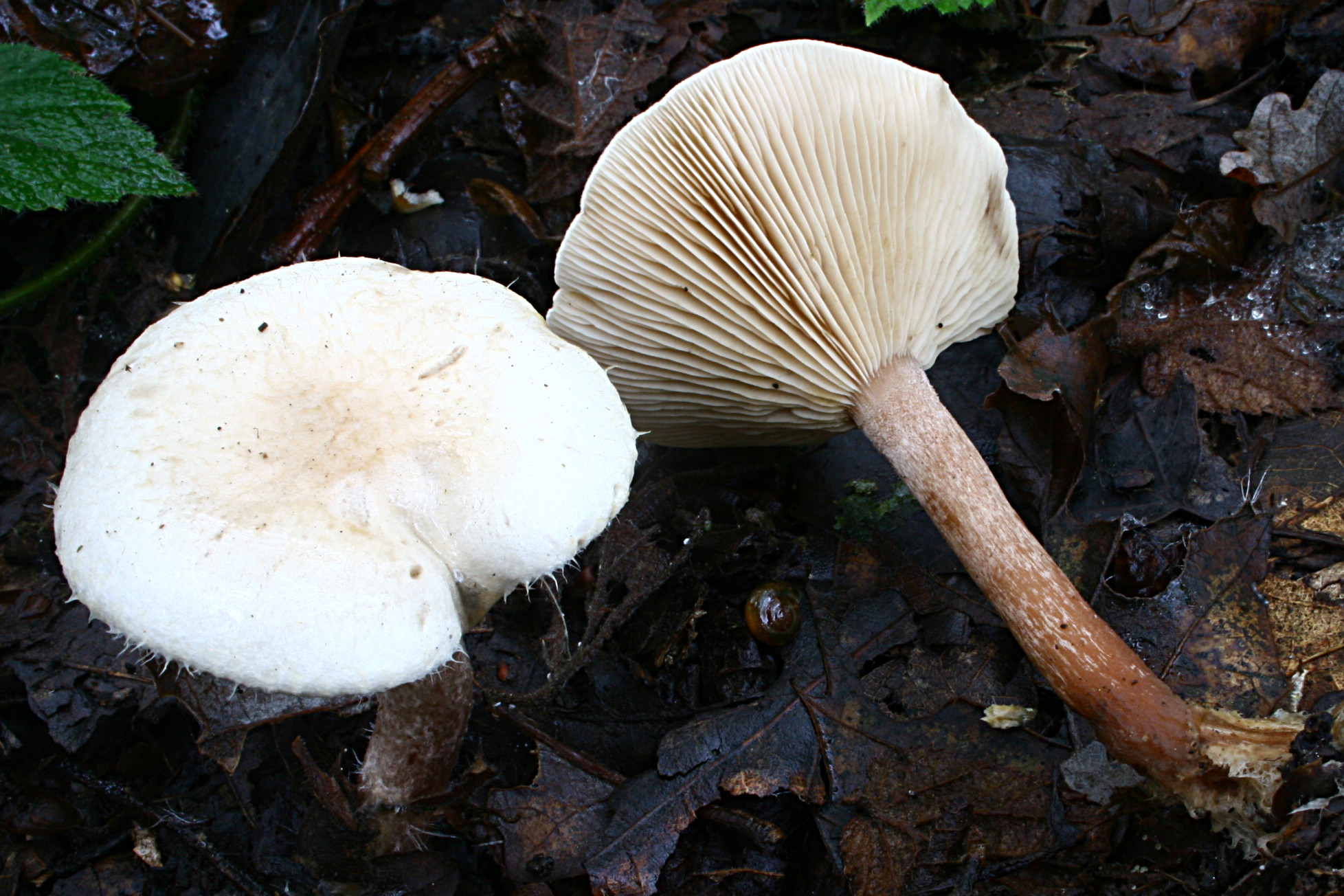
R. tricholoma, showing the spiny hairs at left.

This fungus is reminiscent of a Clitocybe, but the spore powder is light brown instead of white, and when young the cap rim is surrounded by spine-like hairs, which quickly disappear. The cap is convex and whitish with a diameter ranging up to 7 cm (the sources differ on the range of dimensions). The gills are off-white and they are somewhat decurrent down the brownish stem, which has a white frosting ("pruina") when fresh. The flesh has a mild taste and the smell is not distinctive. The roughly spherical spores are warty and about 5 μm x 4 μm in size.
