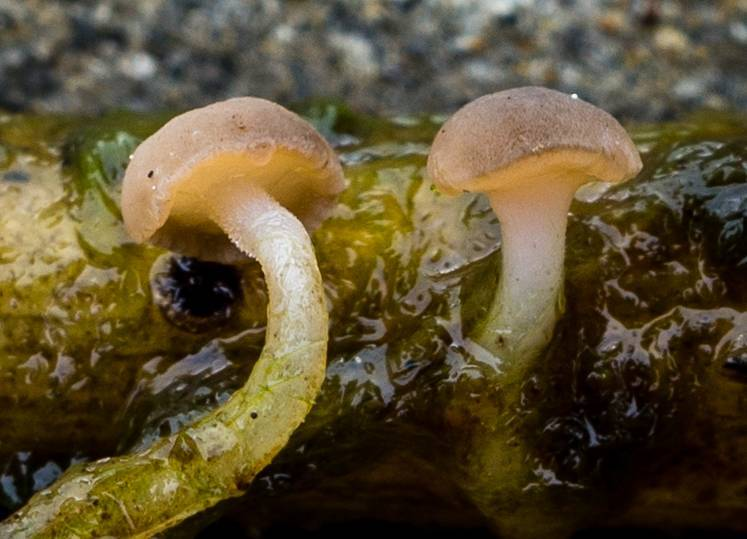

Scientific classification
- Kingdom: Fungi
- Division: Ascomycota
- Class: Leotiomycetes
- Order: Helotiales
- Family: Helotiaceae
- Genus: Cudoniella
- Species: C. clavus

Binomial name
- Cudoniella clavus (Alb. & Schwein.) Dennis (1964)

Synonyms
- Peziza clavus Alb. & Schwein. (1805); Bulgaria clavus (Alb. & Schwein.) Wallr. (1833); Ombrophila clavus (Alb. & Schwein.) Cooke (1880); Helotium clavus (Alb. & Schwein.) Gillet (1882)

= Cudoniella clavus =

Species of fungus

Cudoniella clavus is a species of fungus in the family Helotiaceae. It was first described in 1805 by Johannes Baptista von Albertini and Lewis David de Schweinitz as Peziza clavus. British mycologist R. W. G. Dennis transferred it to Cudoniella in 1964. Fruit bodies of the jelly-like fungus consist of a disc-like cap measuring 0.4–1.2 cm (1/8–1/2 in) with a thin stipe. They are usually cream in colour, sometimes with hints of ochre or violet. They grow on rotting twigs, stems, leaves, and cones that are submerged in water. Cudoniella clavus is a widespread and common species. It is inedible.
