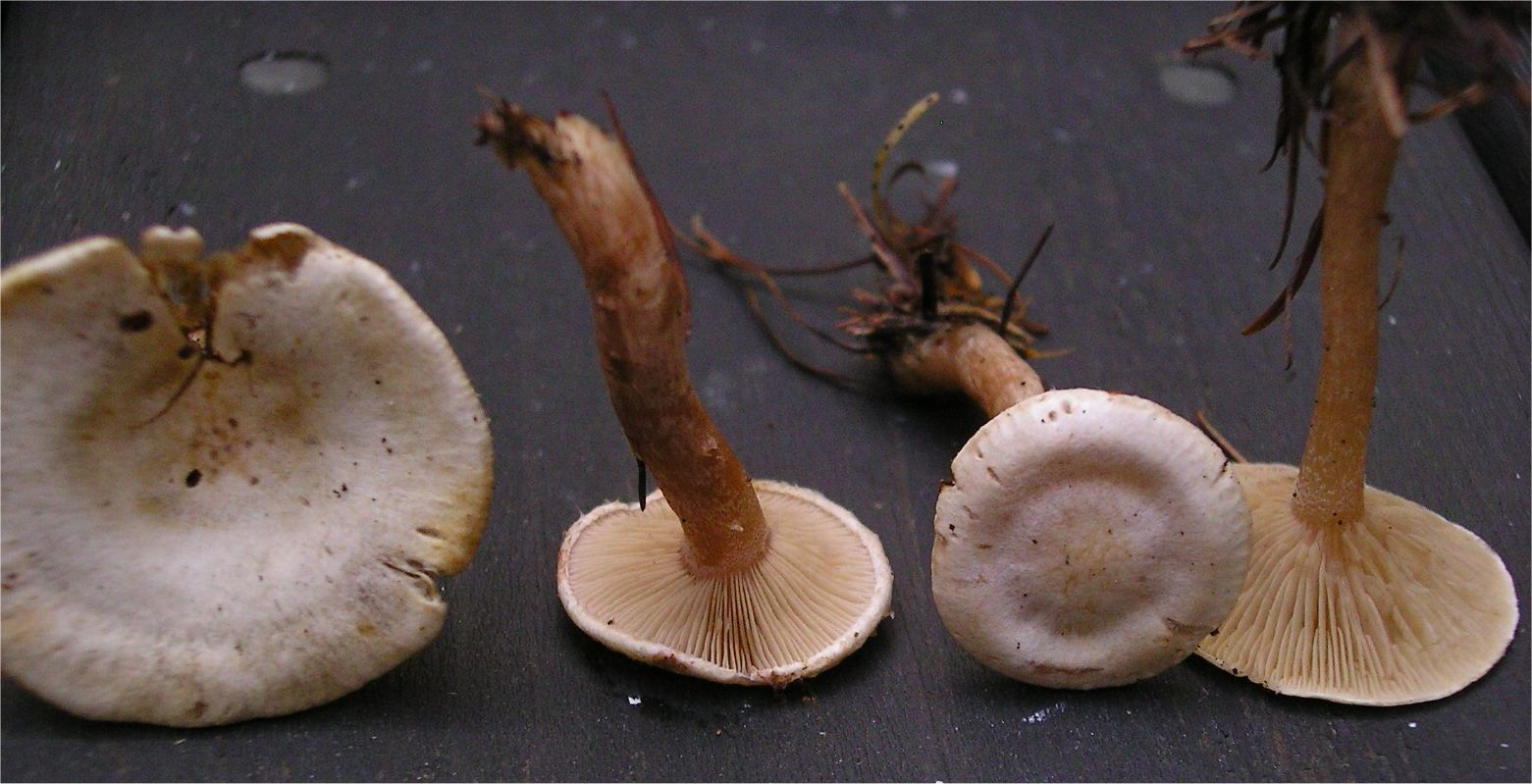
- Ripartites tricholoma

Scientific classification
- Kingdom: Fungi
- Division: Basidiomycota
- Class: Agaricomycetes
- Order: Agaricales
- Family: Tricholomataceae
- Genus: Ripartites; P.Karst. (1879)

Type species
- Ripartites tricholoma (Alb. & Schwein.) P.Karst. (1879)

= Ripartites =

Genus of fungi

Ripartites is a genus of fungi in the family Tricholomataceae. The genus has a widespread distribution and originally contained five species. Species in Ripartites have small, round to subglobose spores, which are yellowish-brown and ornamented. Macroscopically, they resemble Clitocybe. Ripartites was circumscribed by Petter Karsten in 1879.

The genus name of Ripartites is in honour of Jean Baptiste Marie Joseph Solange Eugène Ripart (1815–1878), who was a French physician, botanist and mycologist.

Previously unknown sesquiterpenes have been isolated from Ripartites metrodii and Ripartites tricholoma.

== Species ==
As accepted by Species Fungorum;

- Ripartites albidoincarnatus (Britzelm.) Konrad & Maubl. (1946)
- Ripartites amparae Singer (1951)
- Ripartites flabellatus Natarajan & Raman (1982)
- Ripartites krieglsteineri Enderle & Bon (1990)
- Ripartites metrodii Huijsman (1960)
- Ripartites odorus G. Riousset & Bon (1985)
- Ripartites serotina Einhell. (1973)
- Ripartites tricholoma (Alb. & Schwein.) P. Karst. (1879)

== Former species ==
- R. scambus (Fr.) P. Karst. (1879) = Pholiota scamba within the Strophariaceae family
