= Robak =

Robak is a surname. Notable people with the surname include:

- Adam Robak (born 1957), Polish fencer
- Colby Robak (born 1990), Canadian ice hockey player
- Håkon Robak (1905–1982), Norwegian forester
- Jennie Robak (1932–2014), American politician
- Karol Robak (born 1997), Polish taekwondoist
- Kim Robak (born 1955), American lawyer, lobbyist and politician
- Marcin Robak (born 1982), Polish footballer
