= Phialemonium curvatum =

Scientific classification
- Kingdom: Fungi
- Division: Ascomycota
- Class: Sordariomycetes
- Order: Cephalothecales
- Family: Cephalothecaceae
- Genus: Phialemonium
- Species: P. curvatum

Binomial name
- Phialemonium curvatum Gams, W & M.R. McGinnis (1983)

Synonyms
- Phialemoniopsis curvata (W. Gams & W.B. Cooke) H. Perdomo, D. García, Gené, Cano & Guarro (2013)

Species of fungus

Phialemonium curvatum is a pathogenic fungus in the phylum Ascomycota. The genus was created to accommodate taxa intermediate to Acremonium and Phialophora. This genus is characterized by its abundance of adelophialides and few discrete phialides with no signs of collarettes. Specifically, P. curvatum is characterized by its grayish white colonies and its allantoid conidia. Phialemonium curvatum is typically found in a variety of environments including air, soil, industrial water and sewage. Furthermore, P. curvatum affects mainly immunocompromised and is rarely seen in immunocompetent people. The species has been known to cause peritonitis, endocarditis, endovascular infections, osteomyelitis as well as cutaneous infections of wounds and burns.

== Description and identification ==
Phialemonium curvatum was first described by W. Gans et McGinnis in 1983. It is noted as being pigmented although it lacks dark pigmentation. The colony appearance is flat and glabrous with a white turning yellow appearance surrounded by a yellow pigment surrounding the colony. Conidia of P. curvatum are uniformly cylindrical to bean-shaped with their length ranging from 3.5–6.0 μm and their width varying from 1.0–1.4 μm. A key feature of P. curvatum is its lack of chlamydoconidia, distinguishing it from P. obovatum. As well, the phialides of P. curvatum have poorly defined to absent collarettes with their dimensions varying from 1–7 x 0.5–1.0 μm. Phialemonium curvatum can grow at temperatures between 10–36 °C. Another way of identifying P. curvatum is through the use of PCR and DNA sequencing of the internal transcribed spacer (ITS). By incubating a suspected culture in a GEPD medium at 30 °C, a culture can be grown to allow for the isolation and extraction of genomic DNA. Then through the use ITS1 primers and ITS4, the samples can be amplified, sequenced and analyzed to allow for the identification of P. curvatum.

== Pathogenicity ==
=== Arthritis ===
Case studies have shown that P. curvatum is capable of causing arthritis. The source of the infection has often been traced to a penile or intra-articular injection of a corticosteroid. The course of treatment has been to prescribe the patient with amphotericin B and voriconazole.

=== Endocarditis ===
Phialemonium curvatum rarely causes heart infections, however immunosuppressed patients are far more likely to become infected due to their lower immune function. Endocarditis is an infection of the heart valves and P. curvatum has been linked to this infection through penile injections or through the transplantation of a prosthetic aortic valve. In the case of endocarditis, P. curvatum forms a mass on the heart valve which if left untreated can lead to the impairment of the heart valve and in turn cause a brain infract and consequently death. The key to treating endocarditis caused by P. curvatum is to treat the patient as soon as possible with antifungal medications such as amphotericin B and voriconazole.

=== Endophthalmitis ===
Phialemonium curvatum has been found to be capable of causing endophthalmitis particularly in immune compromised patients. Endophthalmitis is an inflammatory response typically due to an infection of the intraocular cavities. In reference specifically to P. curvatum, hypopyon (an accumulation of pus) as well as vitreous opacities are visible in patients with endophthalmitis. Reported sources of infection can include self intracavernous injections to treat erectile dysfunction as well as phacoemulsification. Histological findings documented in the case study by Weinberger et al. include: necrotizing granulomata, chronic lymphocytic infiltration and fine septate hyphae. Treatment options vary depending on the severity of the infection however, treatment usually consists of antifungal medication such as amphotericin B. Furthermore, the patient may undergo a cataract extraction (if present) and a pars plana vitrectomy. If the patient remains unresponsive to the treatment, then enucleation of the infected eye may be necessary.

=== Peritonitis ===
Phialemonium curvatum has been known to peritonitis, which is a phaeohyphomycosis affecting the peritoneal cavity, and is responsible for 1-10% of infections in patients undergoing peritoneal dialysis. This type of phaeohyphomycosis is associated with a high morbidity and mortality rate. To treat patients with this type of infection, they are put on antifungal medications such as: amphotericin B, ketoconazole, flucytosine and fluconazole until repeated peritoneal fluid cultures show no fungal growth.

=== Subcutaneous infection ===
The subcutaneous infection caused by P. curvatum commences by forming a small cyst, less than one centimeter in diameter, which is not normally fixed to the skin. As the mass enlarges, the middle of the cyst is filled with purulent material containing most of the fungal hyphae (some hyphae may also be present on the wall of the cyst). As the cyst continues to grow, the mass becomes more dense and can eventually ulcerate. This type of granulomatous infection caused by P. curvatum is characterized by the presence of a number of Langhan-type giant cells, fibroblasts, macrophages surrounded by lymphocytes, as well as a decrease in the number of polymorphonuclear leukocytes. At the centre of the granulomata, it is also possible to identify microabscesses, collagen tissue as well as necrotic debris caused by the fungal hyphae. The typical course of treatment is to surgically remove the cyst and may include antifungal medications.

=== Other infections ===
Phialemonium curvatum is known to cause vascular infection in patients undergoing hemodialysis. One of the sources of contamination was found to be contaminated water; other sources may have been renal grafts and bone marrow transplants. There was a report of P. curvatum affecting the lower spine and respiratory system and causing an abscess with purulent material in the middle. The course of treatment included antifungal medications, such amphotericin B, flucytosine, fluconazole, itraconazole, voriconazole and caspofungin, as well as removal of the cyst.
