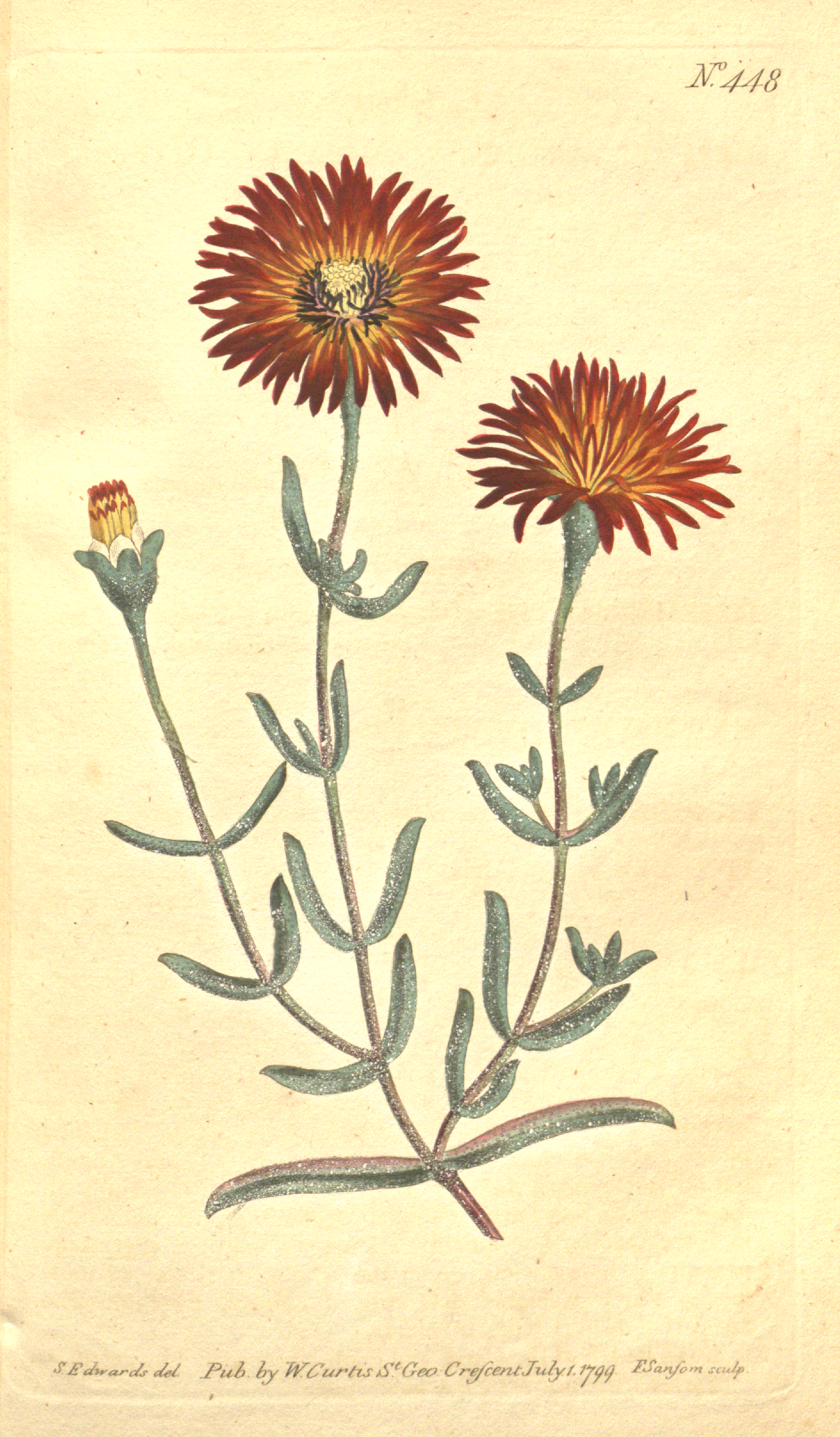

Scientific classification
- Kingdom: Plantae
- Clade: Tracheophytes
- Clade: Angiosperms
- Clade: Eudicots
- Order: Caryophyllales
- Family: Aizoaceae
- Genus: Drosanthemum
- Species: D. micans

Binomial name
- Drosanthemum micans (L.) Schwantes

= Drosanthemum micans =

Species of succulent

Drosanthemum micans (the "Robertson vygie"), is a succulent plant in the ice plant family, Aizoaceae, indigenous to the Robertson Karoo and Overberg regions of the Western Cape Province, South Africa.

== Description ==
The flowers of this species appear in Spring, and they typically have yellow inner petals with red outer petals.

=== Related species ===
Drosanthemum micans is part of a group of similar Drosanthemum species, in subgenus "Speciosa". These nine species all have black filamentous staminodes in the centre of their flowers, they are all small, erect shrubs, and they all occur in the southern Cape, South Africa.

Other species of Drosanthemum subgenus Speciosa include: Drosanthemum bellum, Drosanthemum boerhavii, Drosanthemum edwardsiae, Drosanthemum hallii, Drosanthemum lavisii, Drosanthemum pulchrum, Drosanthemum speciosum, and Drosanthemum uniondalense.

== Distribution ==
Drosanthemum micans is endemic to the Western Cape Province, South Africa. Its distribution range extends from near Worcester in the west, eastwards to Ashton and Montagu, and southwards into the Swellendam and Riversdale districts.

Its habitat is gravelly-to-cobbley alluvial terraces (tertiary pediment gravels). It is frequently found in weathered Malmesbury shale rocks. The surrounding vegetation is usually shale or alluvial renosterveld or transition areas between renosterveld and fynbos vegetation types.
