= Oidiodendron fuscum =

Scientific classification
- Domain: Eukaryota
- Kingdom: Fungi
- Division: Ascomycota
- Class: Eurotiomycetes
- Order: Onygenales
- Family: Myxotrichaceae
- Genus: Oidiodendron
- Species: O. fuscum

Binomial name
- Oidiodendron fuscum Robak (1932)

Species of fungus

Oidiodendron fuscum is a species of the genus of Oidiodendron. Oidiodendron fuscum produces the antibiotic Fuscin.
