= Fuscin =

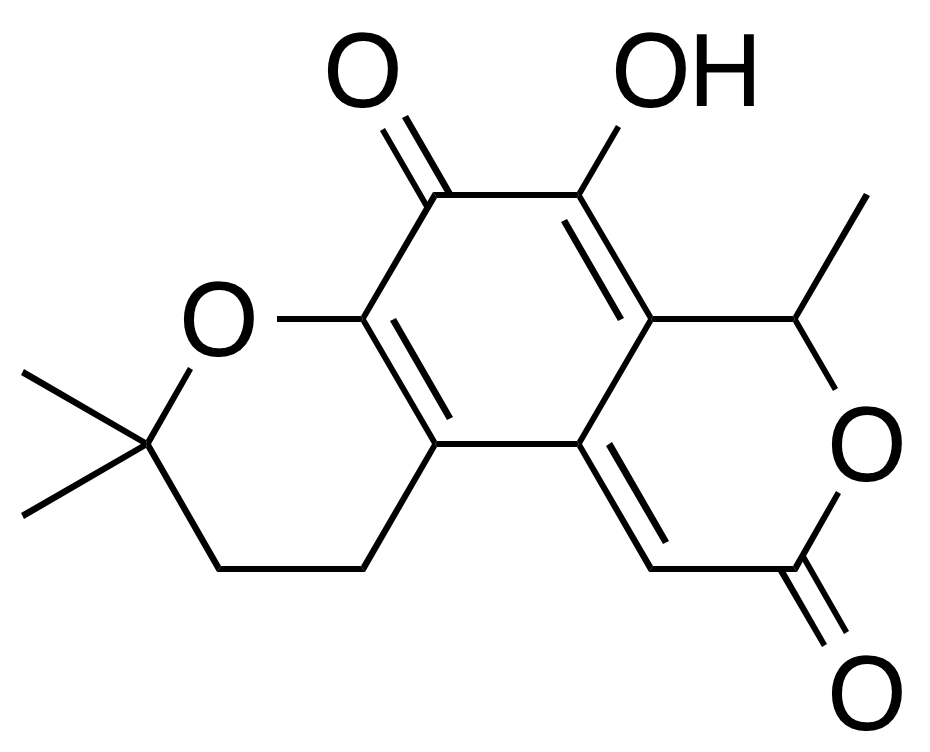

Names
- IUPAC name 5-Hydroxy-4,8,8-trimethyl-9,10-dihydro-4H-pyrano[4,3-f]chromene-2,6-dione
- Other names: 9,10-Dihydro-5-hydroxy-4,8,8-trimethyl-2H,4H-benzo[1,2-b:4,3-c']dipyran-2,6(8H)-dione

Identifiers
CAS Number	83-85-2
3D model (JSmol)	Interactive image
ChemSpider	10774524
PubChem CID	54682467
UNII	0J373729M0
CompTox Dashboard (EPA)	DTXSID80874665
- InChI: InChI=1S/C15H16O5/c1-7-11-9(6-10(16)19-7)8-4-5-15(2,3)20-14(8)13(18)12(11)17/h6-7,17H,4-5H2,1-3H3 Key: OSJKAGRXDVEZQO-UHFFFAOYSA-N
- SMILES: CC1C2=C(C(=O)C3=C(C2=CC(=O)O1)CCC(O3)(C)C)O

Properties
Chemical formula	C_{15}H_{16}O_{5}
Molar mass	276.288 g·mol^{−1}
Melting point	230 °C (446 °F; 503 K)
- Except where otherwise noted, data are given for materials in their standard state (at 25 °C [77 °F], 100 kPa). Infobox references

Fuscin is an antibiotic with the molecular formula C_{15}H_{16}O_{5} which is produced by the fungus Oidiodendron fuscum and other Oidiodendron species and the fungus Potebniamyces gallicola. Fuscin is an ADP transporter inhibitor.
