= Drosanthemum quadratum =

Scientific classification
- Kingdom: Plantae
- Clade: Tracheophytes
- Clade: Angiosperms
- Clade: Eudicots
- Order: Caryophyllales
- Family: Aizoaceae
- Genus: Drosanthemum
- Species: D. quadratum

Binomial name
- Drosanthemum quadratum Klak

Species of succulent

Drosanthemum quadratum is a succulent plant in the ice plant family, Aizoaceae, indigenous to the Overberg region of the Western Cape Province, South Africa.

== Description ==
A low-growing or decumbent succulent shrub. The yellow-green leaves are slightly triangular in cross-section. They are small (8 x 4mm) and fused at the base (connate).

The young flowers have erect stamens and staminodes forming a central cone. The petals each have a central line.

There are four lobes around the flower base. The fruit capsule is also 4-locular. It is 8mm wide and crumbles soon after releasing the seeds.

The stalks (pedicels) are brown and darker coloured towards their bases. They are thickest midway along and thinnest near the top. Like many other Drosanthemum species, the pedicel has a layer of cork within it, especially near the base.

== Distribution ==
This species is endemic to the Western Cape Province, South Africa.

It occurs in quartz-patches, with underlying clay, in rocky renosterveld vegetation between Bredasdorp, Swellendam and Riversdale, in the Overberg region.

It is listed as an endangered species.
