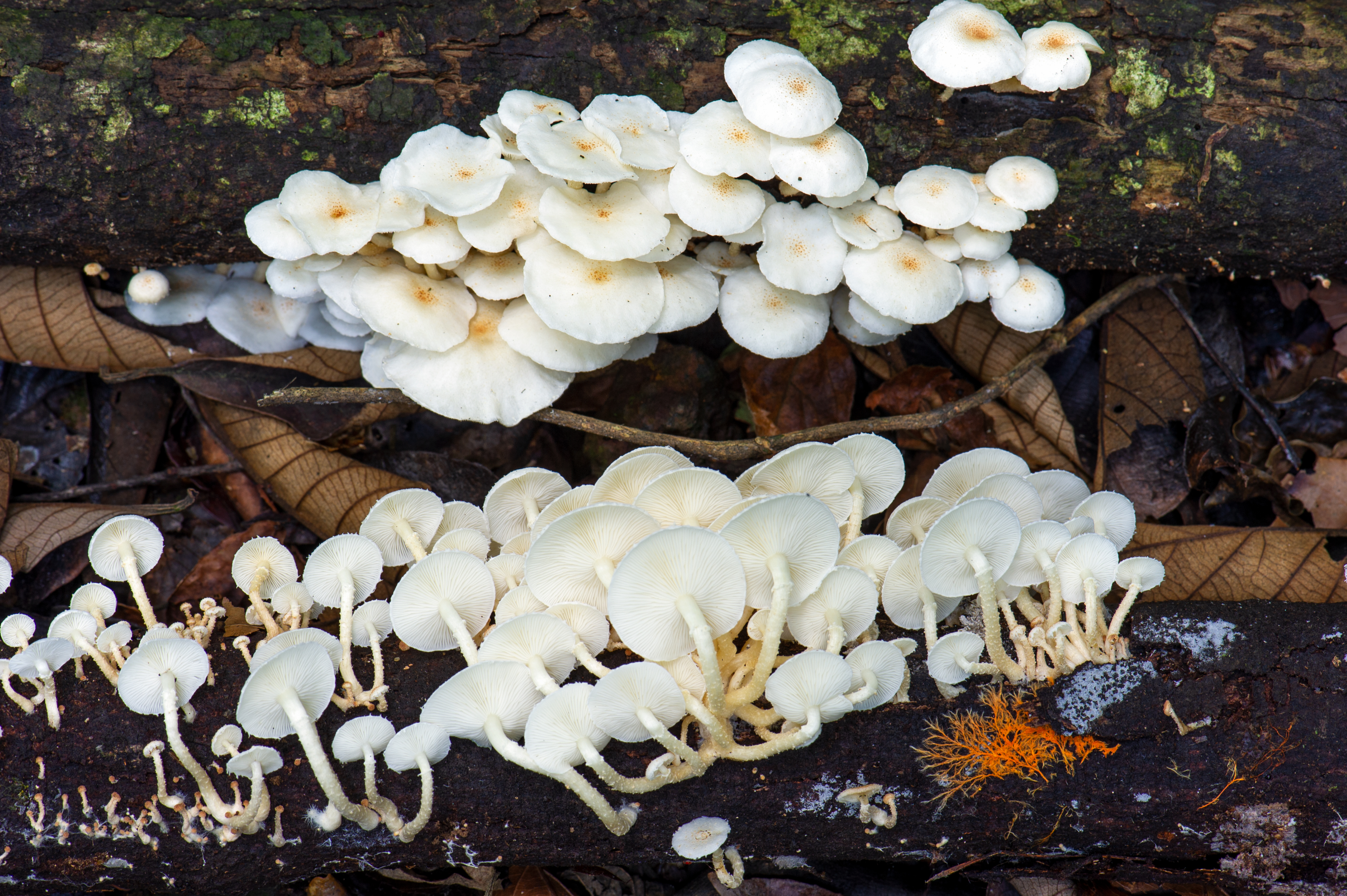
- Ripartitella brasiliensis

Scientific classification
- Kingdom: Fungi
- Division: Basidiomycota
- Class: Agaricomycetes
- Order: Agaricales
- Family: Agaricaceae
- Genus: Ripartitella; Singer (1947)

Type species
- Ripartitella squamosidisca (Murrill) Singer (1947)

= Ripartitella =

Genus of fungi

Ripartitella is a genus of fungi in the family Agaricaceae. The genus was circumscribed by Rolf Singer in Mycologia vol.39 on page 85 in 1947.

The genus name of Ripartitella is in honour of Jean Baptiste Marie Joseph Solange Eugène Ripart (1815–1878), who was a French physician, botanist and mycologist.

== Species ==
As accepted by Species Fungorum;

- Ripartitella alba Halling & Franco-Mol. (1996)
- Ripartitella brasiliensis (Speg.) Singer (1951)
- Ripartitella brunnea Ming Zhang, T.H. Li & T.Z. Wei (2019)
- Ripartitella sipariana (Dennis) Dennis (1970)
- Ripartitella squamosidisca (Murrill) Singer (1947)

Former species;

- R. ponderosa (A.H. Sm. & Singer) Franco-Mol. (1993) = Cercopemyces ponderosus
- R. rickenii (Bohus) Singer (1986) = Cercopemyces rickenii
