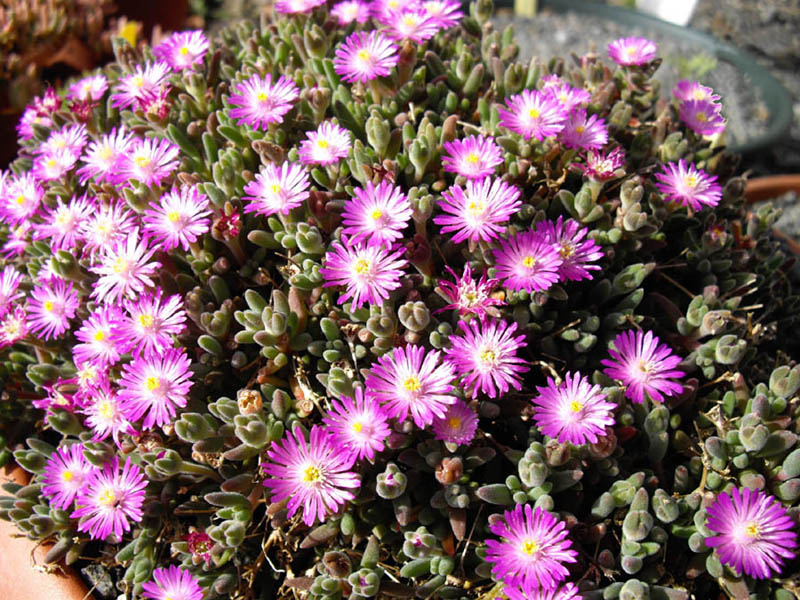

Scientific classification
- Kingdom: Plantae
- Clade: Tracheophytes
- Clade: Angiosperms
- Clade: Eudicots
- Order: Caryophyllales
- Family: Aizoaceae
- Genus: Drosanthemum
- Species: D. hispidum

Binomial name
- Drosanthemum hispidum (L.) Schwantes (1927)

Synonyms
- Mesembryanthemum hispidum L. (1753)

= Drosanthemum hispidum =

Species of plant

Drosanthemum hispidum, the hairy dewflower, is a species of perennial herb in the family Aizoaceae (stone plants). They are succulent plants and have a self-supporting growth form and simple, broad leaves. Flowers are visited by Colletes schultzei.

D. hispidum contains the alkaloid 4'-O-demethylmesembrenol structurally related to alkaloids in Kanna (Sceletium tortuosum).

== Sources ==
This article incorporates text from a free content work. Licensed under CC0 (license statement/permission). Text taken from Drosanthemum hispidum. Encyclopedia of Life.
