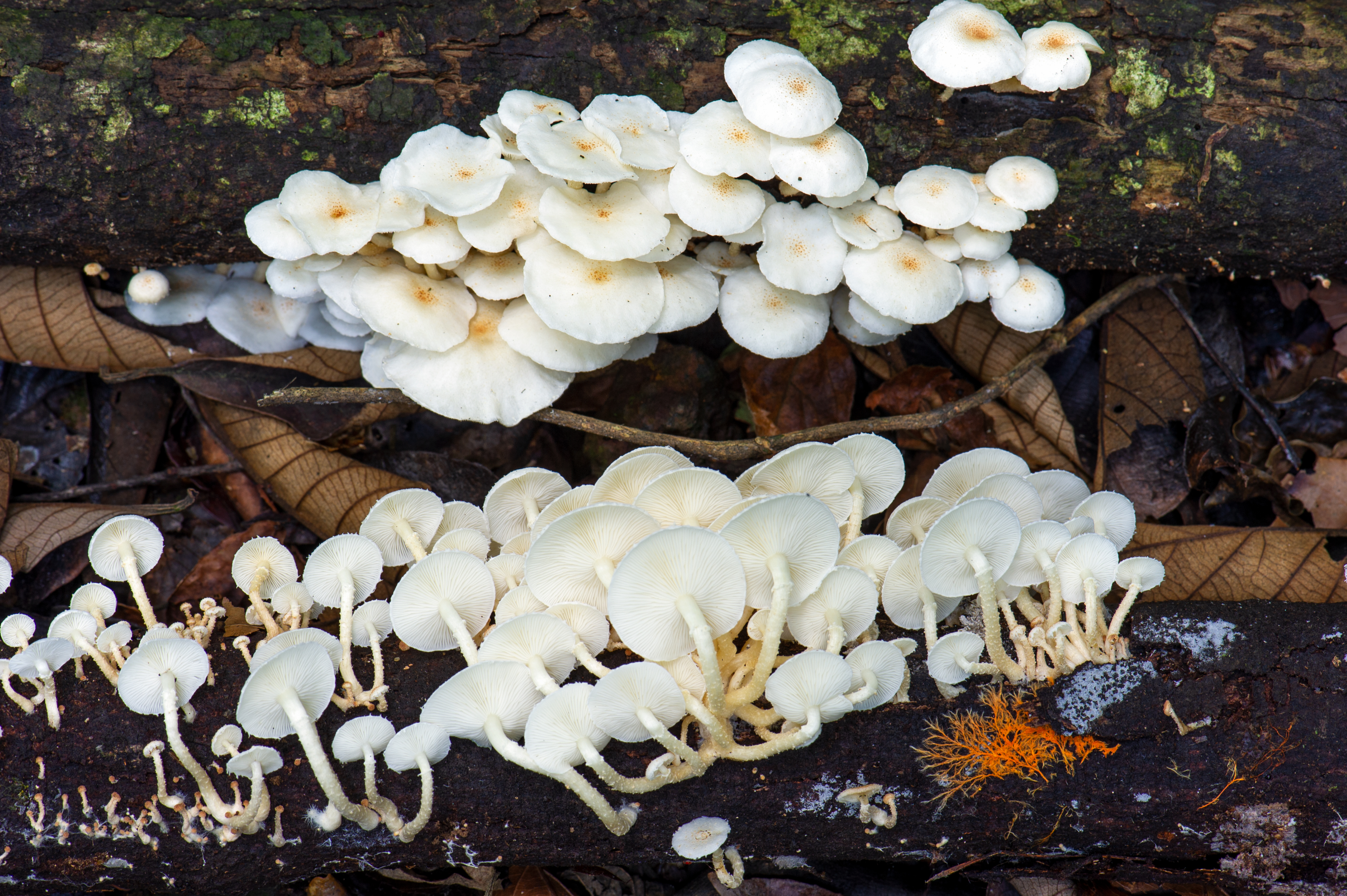

Scientific classification
- Kingdom: Fungi
- Division: Basidiomycota
- Class: Agaricomycetes
- Order: Agaricales
- Family: Agaricaceae
- Genus: Ripartitella
- Species: R. brasiliensis

Binomial name
- Ripartitella brasiliensis (Speg.) Singer (1947)

Synonyms
- Pleurotus brasiliensis Speg. (1889); Dendrosarcus brasiliensis (Speg.) Kuntze (1898)

= Ripartitella brasiliensis =

Species of fungus

Ripartitella brasiliensis, commonly known as the carnival cap, is a species of fungus in the family Agaricaceae. It was originally described as new to science by Carlos Luigi Spegazzini in 1889.

The cap is 1–4 centimetres (1/2–1 1/2 in) wide, with a white surface largely obscured by scales. The stem is 2–7 cm (3/4–2 3/4 in) long and 2–6 millimetres (1/8–1/4 in) thick. The flesh is whitish and the spore print is white.

The fungus is found in North America (near the Gulf Coast from May–November), Central and South America, Africa, and the Bonin Islands of the western Pacific Ocean. It fruits in clusters on the decaying wood of hardwood trees, especially oak.
