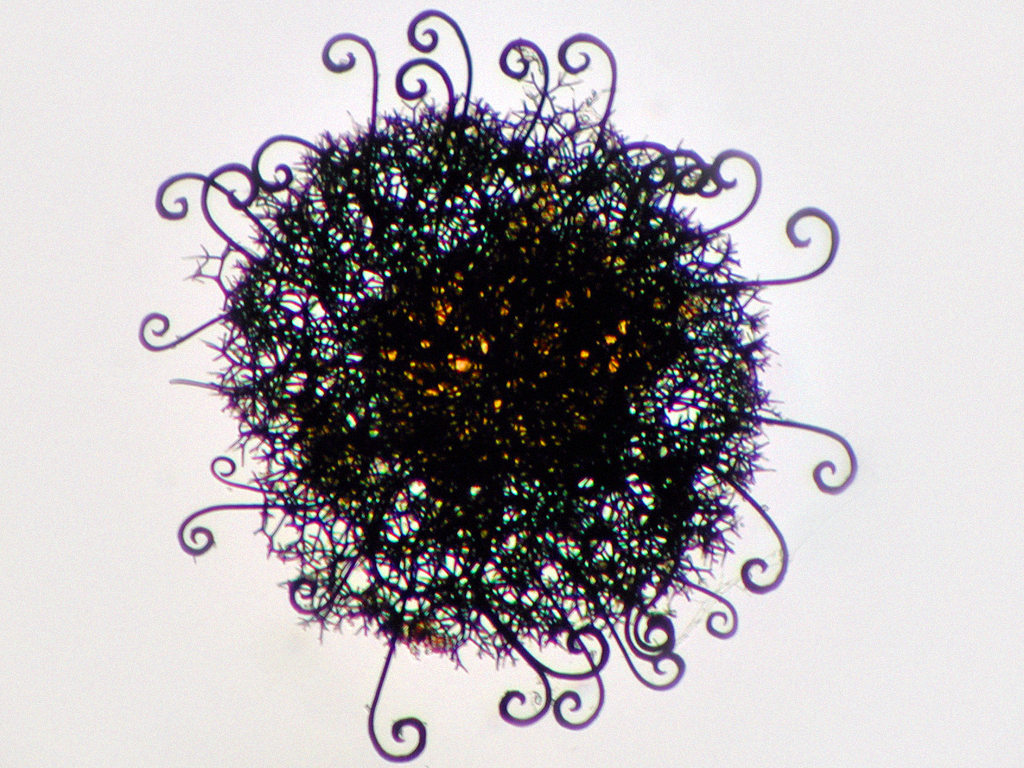
- Myxotrichum chartarum gymnothecium

Scientific classification
- Kingdom: Fungi
- Division: Ascomycota
- Class: Leotiomycetes
- Order: Helotiales
- Family: Myxotrichaceae
- Genus: Myxotrichum; Kunze, 1823

= Myxotrichum =

Genus of fungi

Myxotrichum is a genus of fungi belonging to the family Myxotrichaceae.

The species of this genus are found in Europe and Northern America.

== Species ==
Species:

- Myxotrichum aeruginosum Mont.
- Myxotrichum albicans Jing Liang, B.Y.Liu, Ze Y.Li, W.Meng, Q.G.Wang & L.J.Xu
- Myxotrichum arcticum Udagawa, Uchiy. & Kamiya
- Myxotrichum chartarum Kunze (1823)
