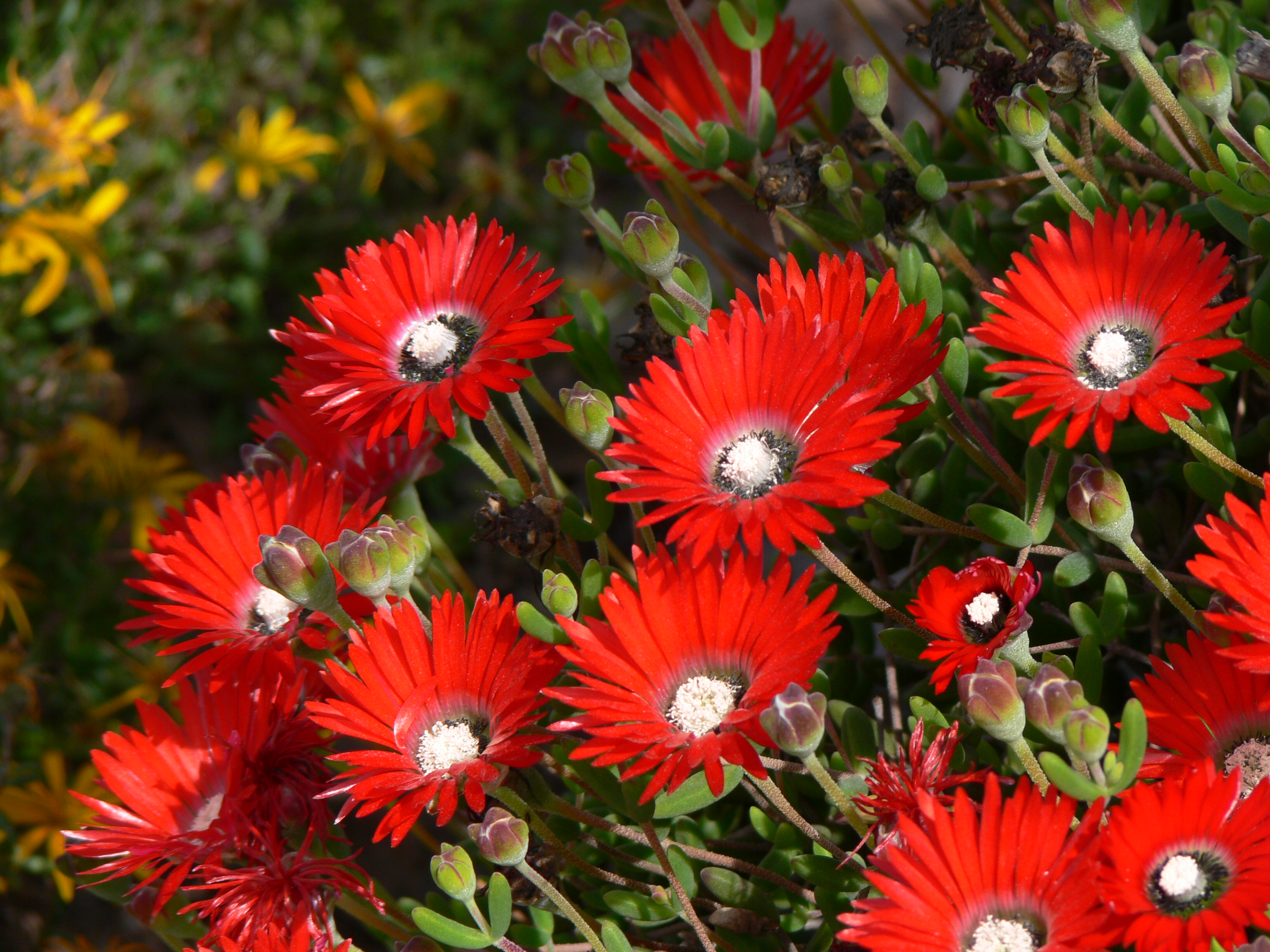
- Drosanthemum speciosum

Scientific classification
- Kingdom: Plantae
- Clade: Tracheophytes
- Clade: Angiosperms
- Clade: Eudicots
- Order: Caryophyllales
- Family: Aizoaceae
- Subfamily: Ruschioideae
- Tribe: Ruschieae
- Genus: Drosanthemum; Schwantes

Species
- 90-120 - see text

= Drosanthemum =

Genus of succulents

Drosanthemum (the dewflowers) is a genus of succulent plants in the ice plant family native to the winter-rainfall regions of southern Africa, including Namibia and the Cape Provinces and Free State of South Africa. Most species bear colorful flowers.

The name Drosanthemum means "dew-flower" in Greek, and refers to the characteristic shiny translucent papillae, which cover the succulent leaves and flower buds.

== Species ==
110 species are accepted:

- Drosanthemum acuminatum L.Bolus
- Drosanthemum acutifolium (L.Bolus) L.Bolus
- Drosanthemum albens L.Bolus
- Drosanthemum albiflorum (L.Bolus) Schwantes
- Drosanthemum ambiguum L.Bolus
- Drosanthemum anemophilum van Jaarsv. & S.A.Hammer
- Drosanthemum anomalum L.Bolus
- Drosanthemum archeri L.Bolus
- Drosanthemum attenuatum (Haw.) Schwantes
- Drosanthemum austricola L.Bolus
- Drosanthemum autumnale L.Bolus
- Drosanthemum barkerae L.Bolus
- Drosanthemum bellum L.Bolus
- Drosanthemum bicolor L.Bolus
- Drosanthemum boerhavii (Eckl. & Zeyh.) H.E.K.Hartmann
- Drosanthemum brakfonteinense Liede, A.Schweiger & H.E.K.Hartmann
- Drosanthemum breve L.Bolus
- Drosanthemum brevifolium (Aiton) Schwantes
- Drosanthemum calycinum (Haw.) Schwantes
- Drosanthemum capillare (L.f.) Schwantes
- Drosanthemum cereale L.Bolus
- Drosanthemum chrysum L.Bolus
- Drosanthemum collinum (Sond.) Schwantes
- Drosanthemum comptonii L.Bolus
- Drosanthemum concavum L.Bolus
- Drosanthemum crassum L.Bolus
- Drosanthemum curtophyllum L.Bolus
- Drosanthemum cymiferum L.Bolus
- Drosanthemum deciduum H.E.K.Hartmann & Bruckm.
- Drosanthemum decumbens (L.Bolus) van Jaarsv.
- Drosanthemum dejagerae L.Bolus
- Drosanthemum delicatulum (L.Bolus) Schwantes
- Drosanthemum dipageae H.E.K.Hartmann
- Drosanthemum duplessiae L.Bolus
- Drosanthemum eburneum L.Bolus
- Drosanthemum ecclesianum Liede & H.E.K.Hartmann
- Drosanthemum edwardsiae L.Bolus
- Drosanthemum erigeriflorum (Jacq.) Stearn
- Drosanthemum exspersum (N.E.Br.) Schwantes
- Drosanthemum filiforme L.Bolus
- Drosanthemum flammeum L.Bolus
- Drosanthemum flavum (Haw.) Schwantes
- Drosanthemum floribundum (Haw.) Schwantes, syn. D. candens (Haw.) Schwantes
- Drosanthemum fourcadei (L.Bolus) Schwantes
- Drosanthemum framesii L.Bolus
- Drosanthemum fulleri L.Bolus
- Drosanthemum giffenii (L.Bolus) Schwantes ex H.Jacobsen
- Drosanthemum glabrescens L.Bolus
- Drosanthemum globosum L.Bolus
- Drosanthemum godmaniae L.Bolus
- Drosanthemum gracillimum L.Bolus
- Drosanthemum hallii L.Bolus
- Drosanthemum hirtellum (Haw.) Schwantes
- Drosanthemum hispidum (L.) Schwantes
- Drosanthemum hispifolium (Haw.) Schwantes
- Drosanthemum inornatum (L.Bolus) L.Bolus
- Drosanthemum intermedium L.Bolus
- Drosanthemum jamesii L.Bolus
- Drosanthemum karrooense L.Bolus
- Drosanthemum latipetalum L.Bolus
- Drosanthemum lavisii L.Bolus
- Drosanthemum laxum L.Bolus
- Drosanthemum leipoldtii L.Bolus
- Drosanthemum leptum L.Bolus
- Drosanthemum lignosum L.Bolus
- Drosanthemum lique (N.E.Br.) Schwantes
- Drosanthemum longipes (L.Bolus) H.E.K.Hartmann
- Drosanthemum luederitzii (Engl.) Schwantes
- Drosanthemum macrocalyx L.Bolus
- Drosanthemum maculatum (Haw.) Schwantes
- Drosanthemum marinum L.Bolus
- Drosanthemum mathewsii L.Bolus
- Drosanthemum micans (L.) Schwantes
- Drosanthemum muirii L.Bolus
- Drosanthemum nollothense Liede & H.E.K.Hartmann
- Drosanthemum nordenstamii L.Bolus
- Drosanthemum obibense Liede & H.E.K.Hartmann
- Drosanthemum oculatum L.Bolus
- Drosanthemum opacum L.Bolus
- Drosanthemum overbergense Klak
- Drosanthemum pallens (Haw.) Schwantes
- Drosanthemum papillatum L.Bolus
- Drosanthemum parvifolium Schwantes
- Drosanthemum pauper (Dinter) Dinter & Schwantes
- Drosanthemum praecultum (N.E.Br.) Schwantes
- Drosanthemum prostratum L.Bolus
- Drosanthemum pubipetalum (L.Bolus) Klak
- Drosanthemum pulchellum L.Bolus
- Drosanthemum pulchrum L.Bolus
- Drosanthemum pulverulentum (Haw.) Schwantes
- Drosanthemum quadratum Klak
- Drosanthemum ramosissimum (Schltr.) L.Bolus
- Drosanthemum salicola L.Bolus
- Drosanthemum schoenlandianum (Schltr.) L.Bolus
- Drosanthemum semiglobosum L.Bolus
- Drosanthemum speciosum (Haw.) Schwantes
- Drosanthemum stokoei L.Bolus
- Drosanthemum striatum (Haw.) Schwantes
- Drosanthemum subclausum L.Bolus
- Drosanthemum subcompressum (Haw.) Schwantes
- Drosanthemum subplanum L.Bolus
- Drosanthemum subspinosum (Kuntze) H.E.K.Hartmann
- Drosanthemum tetramerum H.E.K.Hartmann
- Drosanthemum thudichumii L.Bolus
- Drosanthemum tuberculiferum L.Bolus
- Drosanthemum uniondalense H.E.K.Hartmann
- Drosanthemum vandermerwei L.Bolus
- Drosanthemum vespertinum L.Bolus
- Drosanthemum wittebergense L.Bolus
- Drosanthemum worcesterense L.Bolus
