= Cryptendoxyla =

Scientific classification
- Kingdom: Fungi
- Division: Ascomycota
- Class: Sordariomycetes
- Order: Cephalothecales
- Family: Cephalothecaceae
- Genus: Cryptendoxyla; Malloch & Cain (1970)

Type species
- Cryptendoxyla hypophloia Malloch & Cain (1970)

Genus of fungi

Cryptendoxyla is a genus of fungi in the Cephalothecaceae family of the Ascomycota. This is a monotypic genus, containing the single species Cryptendoxyla hypophloia.
