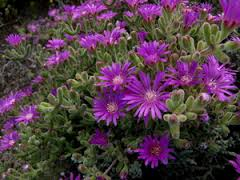

Scientific classification
- Kingdom: Plantae
- Clade: Embryophytes
- Clade: Tracheophytes
- Clade: Angiosperms
- Clade: Eudicots
- Order: Caryophyllales
- Family: Aizoaceae
- Genus: Drosanthemum
- Species: D. floribundum

Binomial name
- Drosanthemum floribundum (Haw.) Schwantes

Synonyms
- Drosanthemum candens (Haw.) Schwantes

= Drosanthemum floribundum =

Species of succulent plant

Drosanthemum floribundum, commonly known as rodondo creeper, pale dewplant, or dew-flower, is a succulent plant in the ice plant family, Aizoaceae. The species is native to the Eastern Cape in South Africa and is naturalised in Portugal and the states of South Australia, Western Australia, and Victoria in Australia, as well as Pacific Grove, California where it is called the Magic Carpet. It is a trailing perennial with hairy stems and leaves that are either cylindrical or triangular in cross section. These are between 3 and 15 mm in length and 1 to 2.5 mm in width. Flowers are up to 2.5 cm in diameter and are lavender, pink or occasionally white.
