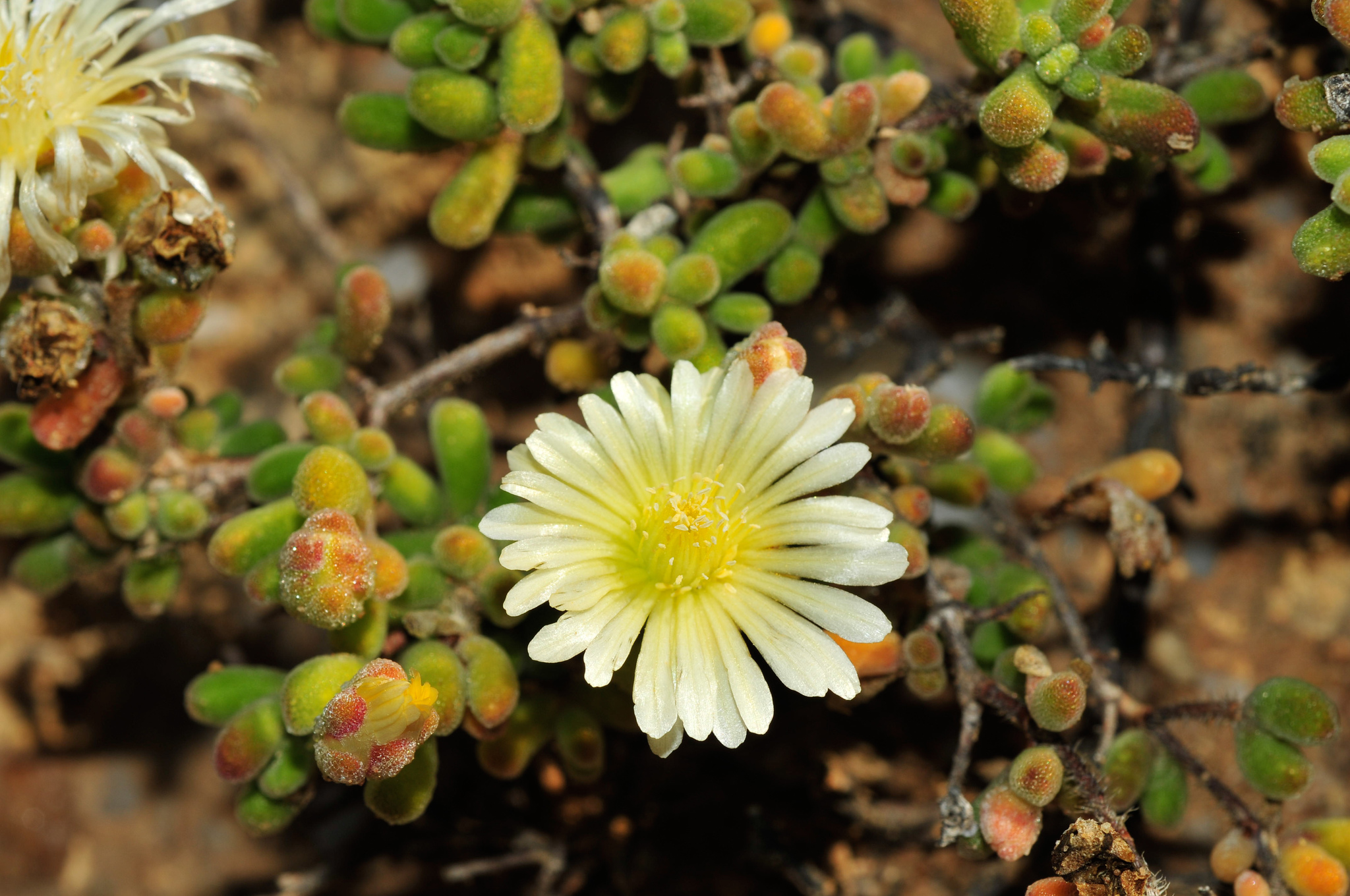

Conservation status
- Least Concern (SANBI Red List)

Scientific classification
- Kingdom: Plantae
- Clade: Tracheophytes
- Clade: Angiosperms
- Clade: Eudicots
- Order: Caryophyllales
- Family: Aizoaceae
- Genus: Drosanthemum
- Species: D. schoenlandianum

Binomial name
- Drosanthemum schoenlandianum (Schltr.) L.Bolus

Synonyms
- Mesembryanthemum schoenlandianum Schltr.

= Drosanthemum schoenlandianum =

Succulent endemic to the Cape Provinces

Drosanthemum schoenlandianum is a species of succulent plant in the genus Drosanthemum. It is endemic to the Cape Provinces of South Africa.

== Conservation status ==
Drosanthemum schoenlandianum is classified as Least Concern as the population trend is stable.
