= Albertiniella =

Scientific classification
- Kingdom: Fungi
- Division: Ascomycota
- Class: Sordariomycetes
- Order: Cephalothecales
- Family: Cephalothecaceae
- Genus: Albertiniella; Kirschst. (1936)

Type species
- Albertiniella reticulata Kirschst. (1936)

Genus of fungi

Albertiniella is a genus of fungi in the family Cephalothecaceae of the Ascomycota. It was circumscribed by German taxonomist Wilhelm Kirschstein in 1936. The relationship of this taxon to other taxa within the Sordariomycetes class is unknown (incertae sedis), and it has not yet been placed with certainty into any order.

The genus name of Albertiniella is in honour of Johannes Baptista von Albertini (1769–1831), who was a German botanist, mycologist and clergyman of the Moravian Church.

== Species ==
As accepted by Species Fungorum:

- Albertiniella polyporicola (Jacz.) Malloch & Cain (1972)
- Albertiniella reticulata Kirschst. (1936)
