= Jean-Baptiste Ripart =

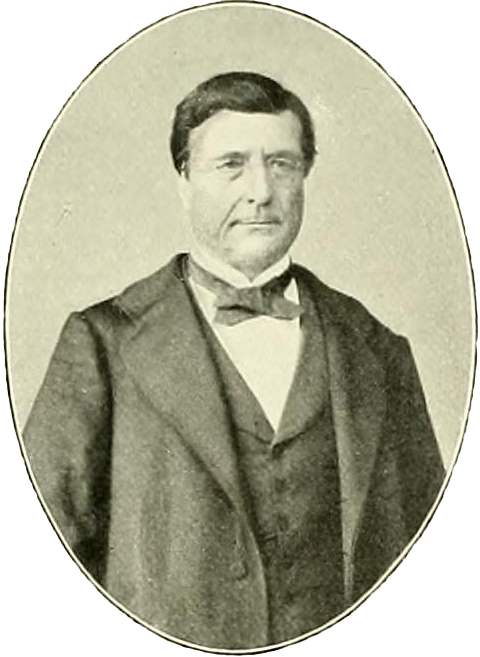
Jean-Baptiste Ripart

Jean Baptiste Marie Joseph Solange Eugène Ripart (15 May 1815, Bessines – 17 October 1878, Bourges) was a French medical doctor, botanist and mycologist.

During his career, he worked as a physician in Bourges. He conducted investigations of cryptogams and performed research of the genera Rosa and Rubus. With Pierre Alfred Déséglise (Rosa) and Léon Gaston Genevier (Rubus), he described numerous botanical species.

The mycological genera of Ripartitella Singer, 1947 and Ripartites P.Karst., 1879 as well as the former plant genus Ripartia Gdgr., 1881 (which is now a synonym of Rosa,), all commemorate his name.

== Published works ==
- "Notice sur la fontaine de Saint-Firmin ou Fontaine-de-fer, sur la composition de ses eaux, leurs propriétés", (1852).
