= Oidiodendron =

Scientific classification
- Kingdom: Fungi
- Division: Ascomycota
- Class: Leotiomycetes
- Order: Helotiales
- Family: Myxotrichaceae
- Genus: Oidiodendron; Robak (1932)

Type species
- Oidiodendron fuscum Robak (1932)

Genus of fungi

Oidiodendron is a genus of fungi in the family Myxotrichaceae. It has 26 species. The genus was circumscribed by Norwegian forester Håkon Robak in 1932, with Oidiodendron fuscum assigned as the type species. The species is now known as Oidiodendron tenuissimum.

== Species ==
- Oidiodendron ambiguum Peyronel & Malan (1949)
- Oidiodendron cereale (Thüm.) G.L.Barron (1962)
- Oidiodendron chlamydosporicum Morrall (1968)
- Oidiodendron echinulatum G.L.Barron (1962)
- Oidiodendron eucalypti Crous (2018)
- Oidiodendron fimicola A.V.Rice & Currah (2005)
- Oidiodendron flavum Svilv. (1941)
- Oidiodendron gracile Zhdanova (1963)
- Oidiodendron griseum Robak (1934)
- Oidiodendron hughesii Udagawa & Uchiy. (1999)
- Oidiodendron majus G.L.Barron (1962)
- Oidiodendron mellicola Rodr.-Andr., Cano & Stchigel (2019)
- Oidiodendron myxotrichoides M.Calduch, Gené & Guarro (2002)
- Oidiodendron periconioides Morrall (1968)
- Oidiodendron pilicola Kobayasi (1969)
- Oidiodendron ramosum M.Calduch, Stchigel, Gené & Guarro (2004)
- Oidiodendron reticulatum M.Calduch, Stchigel, Gené & Guarro (2004)
- Oidiodendron rhodogenum Robak (1932)
- Oidiodendron robustum Mercado & R.F.Castañeda (1985)
- Oidiodendron scytaloides W.Gams & B.E.Söderstr. (1983)
- Oidiodendron setiferum Essl. (1987)
- Oidiodendron sulfureum (Cooke & Massee) Stalpers (1973)
- Oidiodendron tenuissimum (Peck) S.Hughes (1958)
- Oidiodendron terrestre R.Y.Roy & G.N.Singh (1969)
- Oidiodendron truncatum G.L.Barron (1962)
