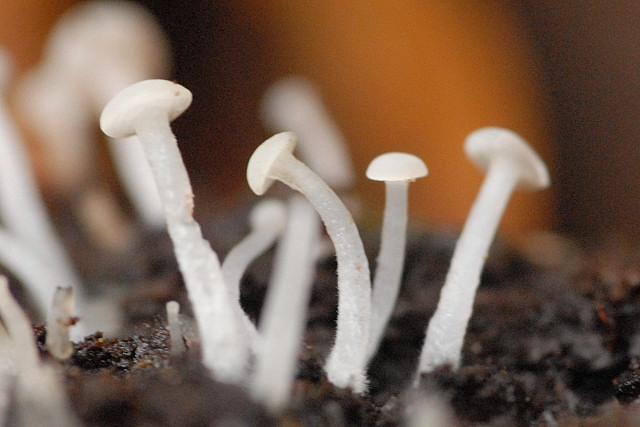
- Cudoniella acicularis

Scientific classification
- Kingdom: Fungi
- Division: Ascomycota
- Class: Leotiomycetes
- Order: Helotiales
- Family: Helotiaceae
- Genus: Cudoniella; Sacc. (1889)

Type species
- Cudoniella queletii (Fr.) Sacc. (1889)

Synonyms
- Isosoma Svrcek (1989)

= Cudoniella =

Genus of fungi

Cudoniella is a genus of fungi in the family Helotiaceae. The genus contains an estimated 30 species. Cudoniella was circumscribed by mycologist Pier Andrea Saccardo in 1889.

== Species ==
- Cudoniella acicularis
- Cudoniella affinis
- Cudoniella bataillei
- Cudoniella brasiliensis
- Cudoniella buissonii
- Cudoniella clavus
- Cudoniella junciseda
- Cudoniella indica
- Cudoniella lichenigera
- Cudoniella queletii
- Cudoniella rubicunda
- Cudoniella tenuispora
- Cudoniella viridula

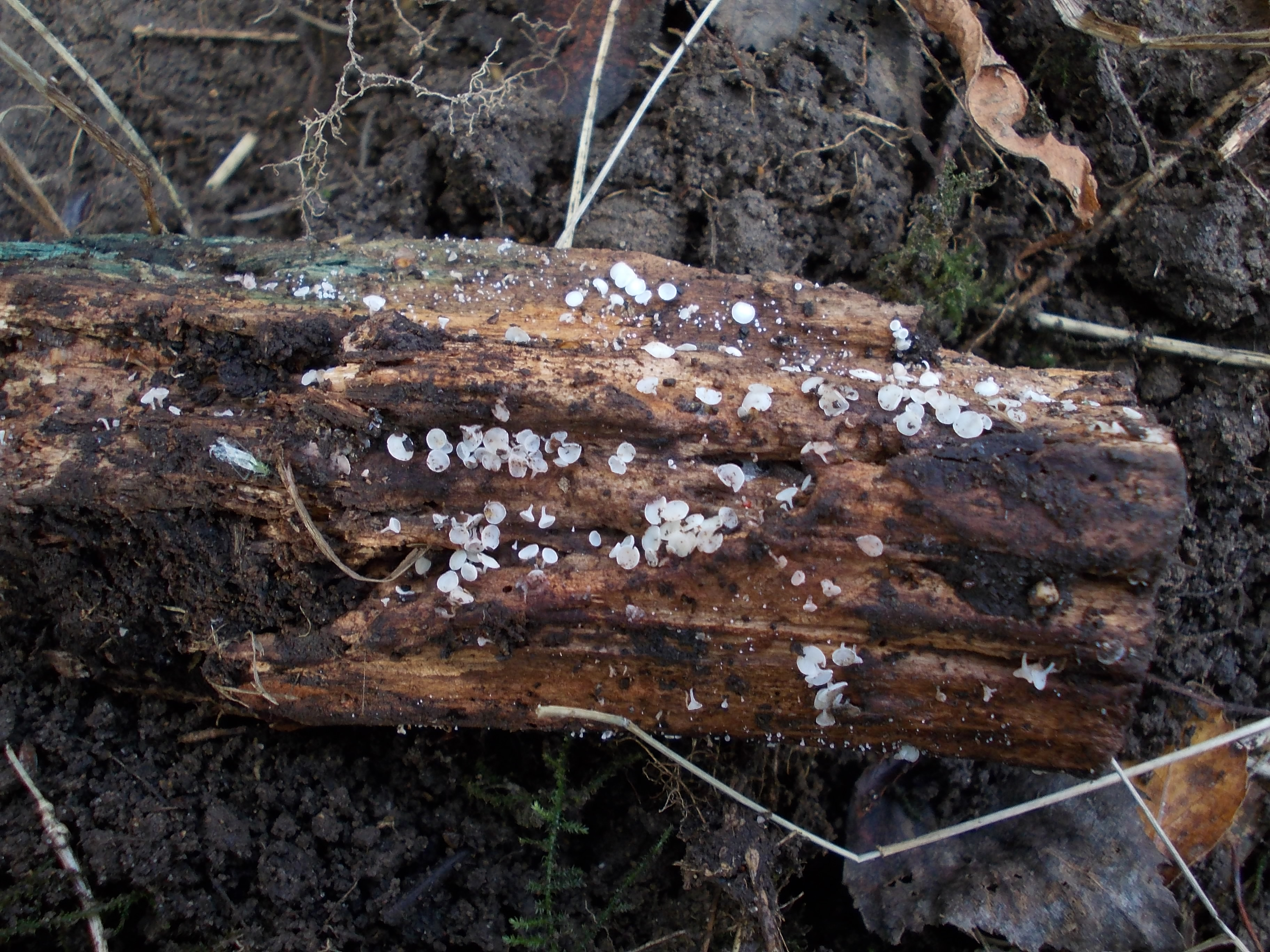
A mass of Cudoniella acicularis growing on dead wood in Gunnersbury Triangle local nature reserve
