= Phialemonium =

Scientific classification
- Kingdom: Fungi
- Division: Ascomycota
- Class: Sordariomycetes
- Order: Cephalothecales
- Family: Cephalothecaceae
- Genus: Phialemonium; W.Gams & McGinnis (1983)

Type species
- Phialemonium obovatum W.Gams & McGinnis (1983)

Species
- P. atrogriseum P. curvatum P. dimorphosporum P. globosum P. inflatum P. obovatum

Genus of fungi

Phialemonium is a genus of fungi in the family Cephalothecaceae of the Ascomycota. The genus was circumscribed by Walter Gams and Michael McGinnis in 1983. The genus is intermediate between Acremonium and Phialophora. It is classified as a dematiaceous (dark-walled) fungus.

== Studies ==
A study from Oxford Academy considered Phialemonium species to have been isolated from air, soil, industrial water, and sewage and although these species rarely cause human disease, infection is often fatal.
