= Cephalotheca =

Scientific classification
- Kingdom: Fungi
- Division: Ascomycota
- Class: Sordariomycetes
- Order: Cephalothecales
- Family: Cephalothecaceae
- Genus: Cephalotheca; Fuckel

Type species
- Cephalotheca sulfurea Fuckel

Genus of fungi

Cephalotheca is a genus of fungi in the Cephalothecaceae family of the Ascomycota. The relationship of this taxon to other taxa within the Sordariomycetes class is unknown (incertae sedis), and it has not yet been placed with certainty into any order. There are 16 species within the genus.

== Species ==
Cephalotheca contains the following species.

- Cephalotheca abellinensis Sacc.
- Cephalotheca argentina Speg.
- Cephalotheca cellaris Richon
- Cephalotheca clarkii Dennis
- Cephalotheca foveolata Yaguchi, Nishim. & Udagawa
- Cephalotheca francisci D. Sacc.
- Cephalotheca hispida Richon
- Cephalotheca kriegeri Rehm
- Cephalotheca pakistanica Matsush.
- Cephalotheca palearum Richon
- Cephalotheca prolifica (Bainier) Sacc. & Trotter
- Cephalotheca reniformis Sacc. & Therry
- Cephalotheca savoryi C. Booth
- Cephalotheca splendens Udagawa & Y. Horie
- Cephalotheca sulfurea Fuckel
- Cephalotheca zeyheriae C. Ram
