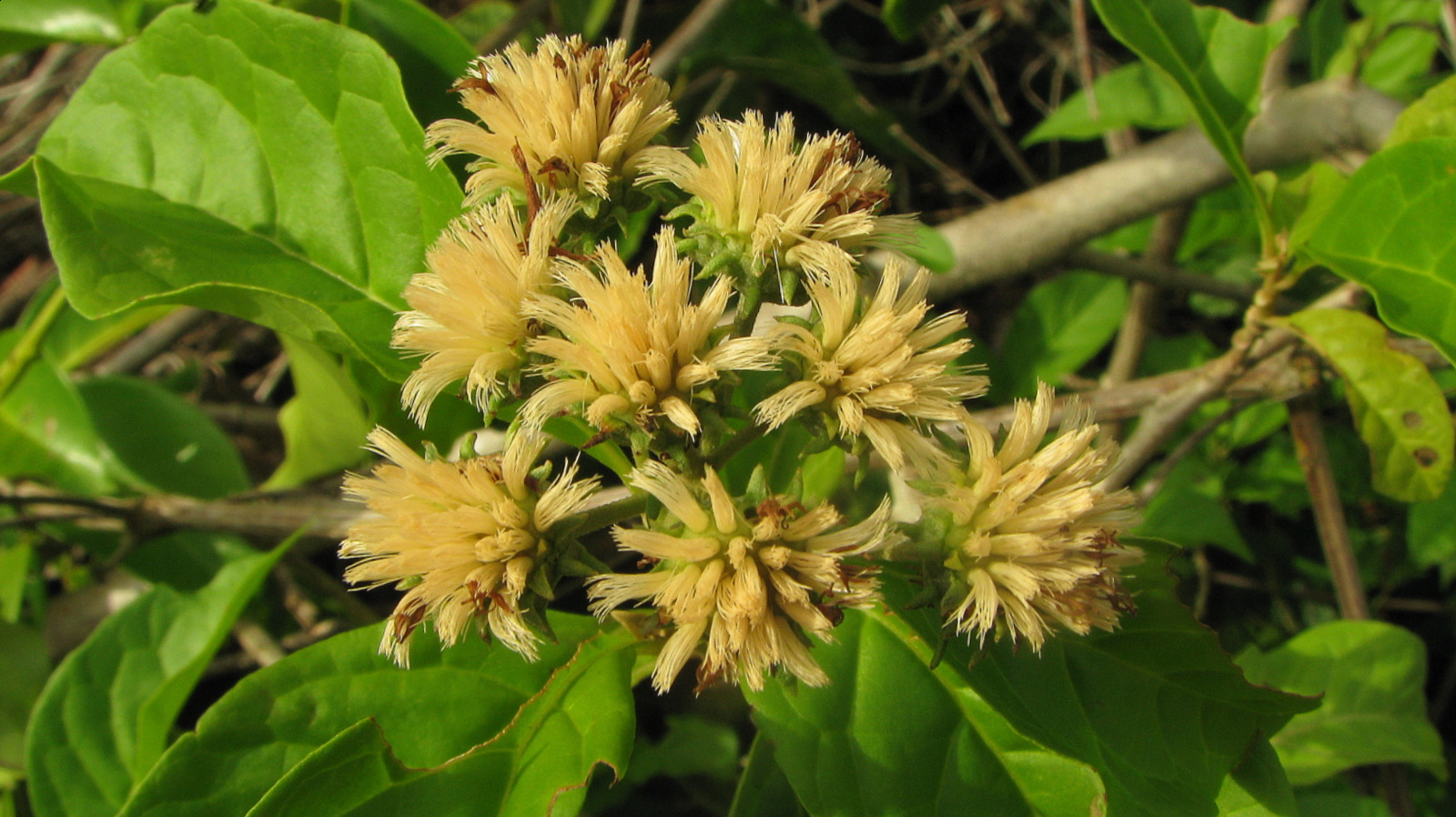

Scientific classification
- Kingdom: Plantae
- Clade: Tracheophytes
- Clade: Angiosperms
- Clade: Eudicots
- Clade: Asterids
- Order: Asterales
- Family: Asteraceae
- Subfamily: Vernonioideae
- Tribe: Vernonieae
- Genus: Albertinia; Spreng.
- Species: A. brasiliensis

Binomial name
- Albertinia brasiliensis Spreng.

= Albertinia =

Genus of flowering plants

Albertinia is a genus of flowering plants in the daisy family described as a genus in 1820.

There is only one accepted species, although several other names have been proposed. Albertinia brasiliensis is endemic to Brazil.

The genus is named for German mycologist Johannes Baptista von Albertini.
