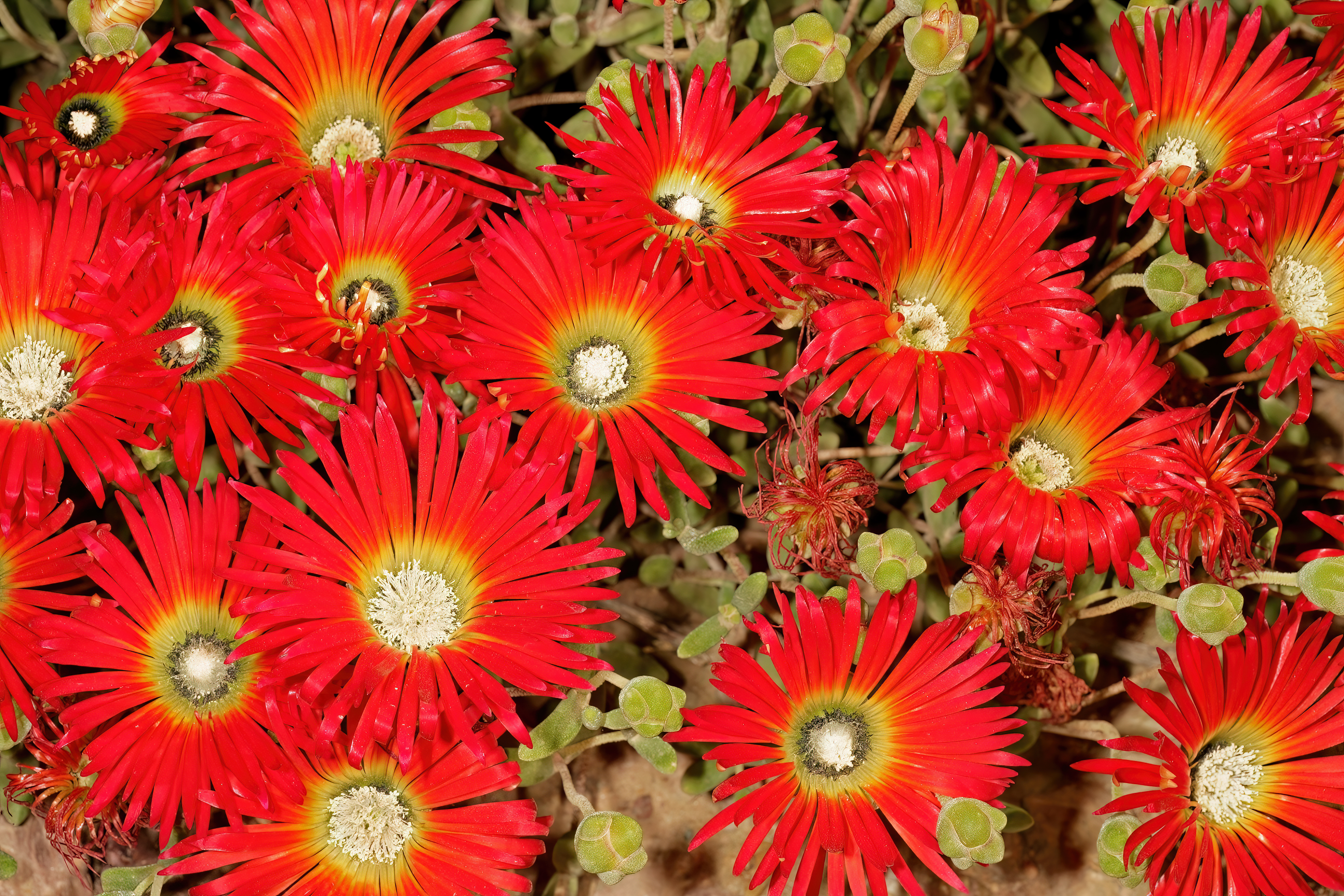

Scientific classification
- Kingdom: Plantae
- Clade: Tracheophytes
- Clade: Angiosperms
- Clade: Eudicots
- Order: Caryophyllales
- Family: Aizoaceae
- Genus: Drosanthemum
- Species: D. speciosum

Binomial name
- Drosanthemum speciosum (Haw.) Schwantes

Synonyms
- Mesembryanthemum speciosum Haw.; Drosanthemum pickhardii L.Bolus; Drosanthemum splendens L.Bolus

= Drosanthemum speciosum =

Species of succulent

Drosanthemum speciosum or royal dewflower is a succulent plant in the Ice plant Family (Aizoaceae) and native to the Montague District in the south of the Cape Province of South Africa. The flowers have two whorls of staminodes: The inner whorl of about thirty are very short and almost black. The outer whorl of about sixty are long and bright orange.
