= Johannes Baptista von Albertini =

German botanist and clergyman of the Moravian Church (1769–1831)

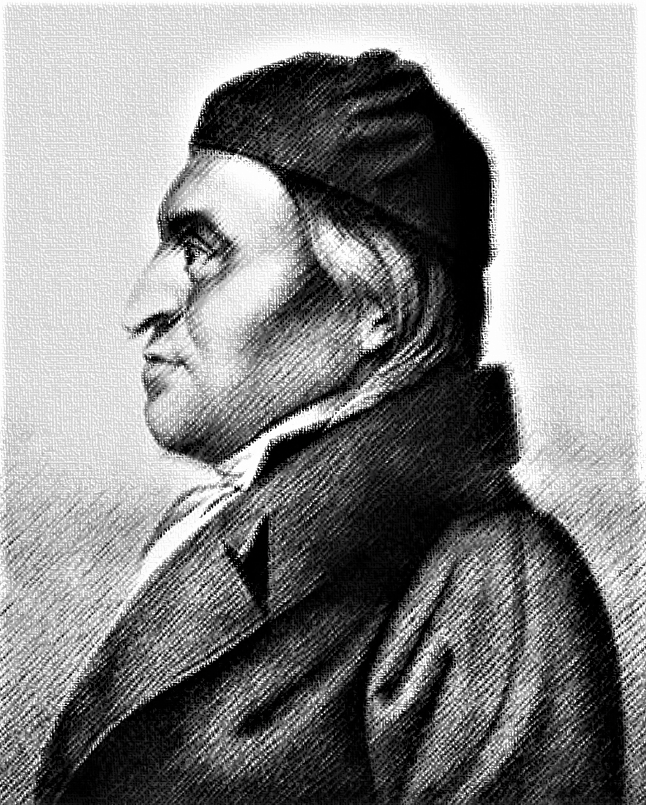
- Born: 17 February 1769; Neuwied
- Died: 6 December 1831 (aged 62)
- Occupations: Moravian Clergyman, botanist

Johannes Baptista von Albertini (17 February 1769 – 6 December 1831) was a German botanist, mycologist and clergyman of the Moravian Church. He was born in the town of Neuwied.

He studied theology in Niesky and at the seminary in Barby. During this period, he became a friend of Friedrich Schleiermacher (1768–1834), who later became a renowned theologian. In 1796 Albertini became a lecturer at the seminary in Niesky, and in 1804 was a minister in Niesky. In 1814, he was elected bishop, and in 1824 was chairman of the Unitätsältestenkonferenz, the denomination's executive board, in Berthelsdorf. He was a gifted speaker and a highly influential minister, and in 180,5 a compilation of his sermons was published as 30 Predigten für Freunde und Mitglieder der Brüdergemeine (Thirty Sermons for Friends and Members of the Moravian Brethren's Church).

In the field of mycology, he was co-author with Lewis David de Schweinitz (1780–1834) of a work on Upper Lusatian fungi titled Conspectus Fungorum in Lusatiae superioris agro Niskiensi crescentium e methodo Persooniana. This publication described 1130 species, of which 127 were considered to be new species.

The plant genus Albertinia within the family Asteraceae was named in his honor in 1821. Albertiniella which is a genus of fungi in the family Cephalothecaceae of the Ascomycota, was published in 1936.

== Selected works ==
- Conspectus fungorum in Lusatiae Superioris agro Niskiensi crescentium. E methodo Persooniana : Cum tabulis XII aeneis pictis, species novas XCIII sistentibus. Lipsiae : Sumtibus Kummerianis, 1805
- Geistliche Lieder. Bunzlau, 1821.
- Dreiszig Predigten : Für Mitglieder und Freunde der Brüdergemeine. evangelische Brüder-Unität (3rd edition 1829).
- Sechs und dreissig Reden, an die Gemeine in Herrnhut in den Jahren von 1818 bis 1824 gehalten. Gnadau, 1832–33.
- Sammlung auserlesener Predigten zur Beförderung des wahren Christenthums : erster Theil, enthaltend dreissig Predigten. Reutlingen : Verlag der Schriften für wahres Christenthum, in Commission der J. Raach'schen Buchhandlung, 1840.
- Mit Israel am Berge : Gedichte über Matth. 5, 1-11. Gnadau : In Commission bei C.H. Pemsel, 1864.

== See also ==
- Category:Taxa named by Johannes Baptista von Albertini
