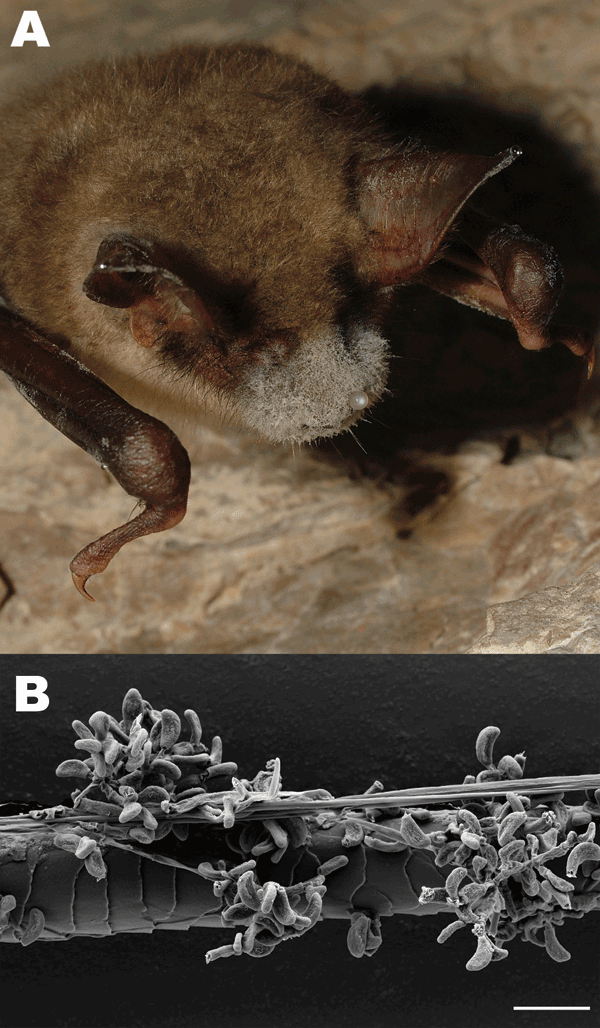
- A) Greater mouse-eared bat (Myotis myotis) with white fungal growth. B) Scanning electron micrograph of a bat hair colonized by Pseudogymnoascus destructans. Scale bar=10 μm

Scientific classification
- Kingdom: Fungi
- Division: Ascomycota
- Class: Leotiomycetes
- Order: Helotiales
- Family: Myxotrichaceae; Locq. ex Currah (1985)

Type genus
- Myxotrichum Kunze (1823)

Genera
- Byssoascus; Geomyces; Malbranchea; Myxotrichum; Oidiodendron

= Myxotrichaceae =

Family of fungi

The Myxotrichaceae are a family of fungi in the Ascomycetes class, and has seven genera. Fungi in this family are mostly found in soil. Indoors, they can be found in paper substrates, damp drywall, and decomposing materials. They produce black, mesh-like, setose ascocarps with small, fusiform ascospores. Myxotrichum deflexum produces a pinkish-red diffusing pigment and may produce grey, black, and brown stains on paper surfaces. No reports of mycotoxins, pathogenicity, or allergy are known.
