= Håkon Robak =

Norwegian forester (1905–1982)

Håkon Robak (10 November 1905 – 5 February 1982) was a Norwegian forester.

He took the dr.philos. degree in 1943. By then he had already been hired at the research institution Vestlandets forstlige forsøksstasjon in 1941. He was promoted to the rank of professor here in 1954, and managed the research station from 1956 to 1972. His special fields were forest pathology and mycological physiology. Vestlandets forstlige forsøksstasjon became a part of Skogforsk through a 1972 merger, which in turn became the Norwegian Forest and Landscape Institute through a 2006 merger.

Robak was killed by a vehicle when crossing the road at Nesttun in February 1982. The car closest to Robak came to a halt, but was rammed from behind, thus hitting the pedestrian. Robak died before being transported to Haukeland Hospital.
