= Cephalothecaceae =

Scientific classification
- Kingdom: Fungi
- Division: Ascomycota
- Class: Sordariomycetes
- Subclass: Sordariomycetidae
- Order: Cephalothecales; Hubka & Réblová
- Family: Cephalothecaceae; Höhn. (1917)

Type genus
- Cephalotheca Fuckel (1871)

Genera
- Albertiniella; Cephalotheca; Cryptendoxyla; Phialemonium; Victoriomyces

Family of fungi

The Cephalothecaceae are a family of fungi in the class Sordariomycetes. The family was circumscribed in 1917 by Austrian naturalist Franz Xaver Rudolf von Höhnel. Species in this family are saprobic, often growing on rotten wood or on other fungi. They are known to be distributed in northern temperate regions. The family was placed in a monotypic class Cephalothecales Hubka & Réblová in Index Fungorum 424: 1 (2019).

The family Cephalothecaceae contains the genera (with amount of species); Albertiniella Kirschst. (1936) (2), Cephalotheca Fuckel (1871) (14), Cryptendoxyla Malloch & Cain (1970) (2), Phialemonium W. Gams & McGinnis (1983) (9) and Victoriomyces (1 - Victoriomyces antarcticus Maggi, Davolos & Persiani (2019).
